= November 1965 =

Month of 1965

| << | November 1965 | | | | | >> |
| Su | Mo | Tu | We | Th | Fr | Sa |
| | 1 | 2 | 3 | 4 | 5 | 6 |
| 7 | 8 | 9 | 10 | 11 | 12 | 13 |
| 14 | 15 | 16 | 17 | 18 | 19 | 20 |
| 21 | 22 | 23 | 24 | 25 | 26 | 27 |
| 28 | 29 | 30 |

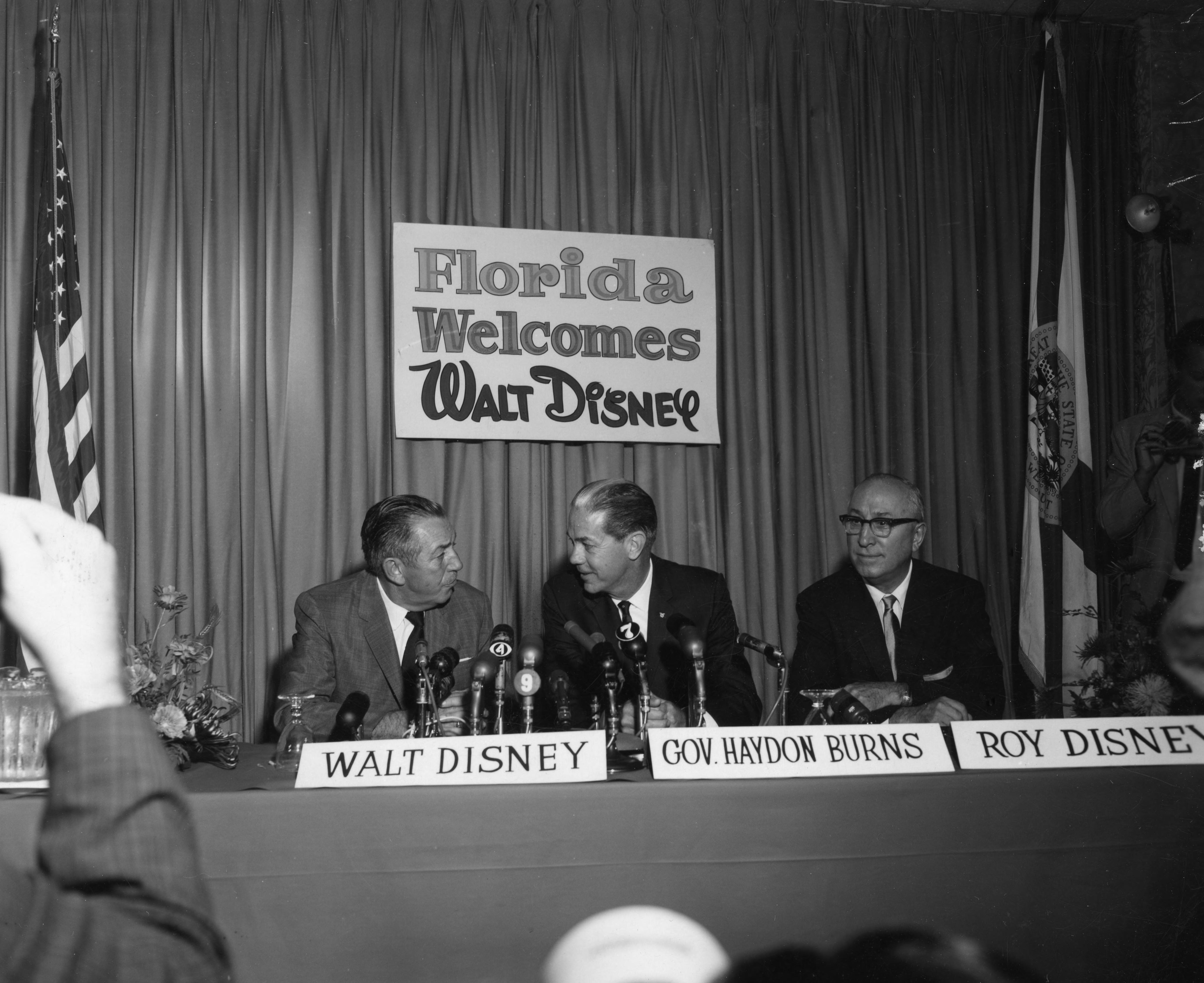
November 15, 1965: Walt Disney announces new theme park for Florida

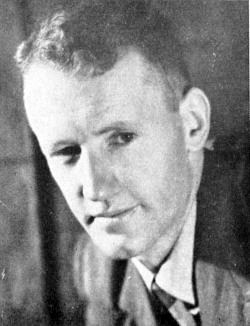
Rhodesia declared independent from the UK by colonial Prime Minister Ian Smith

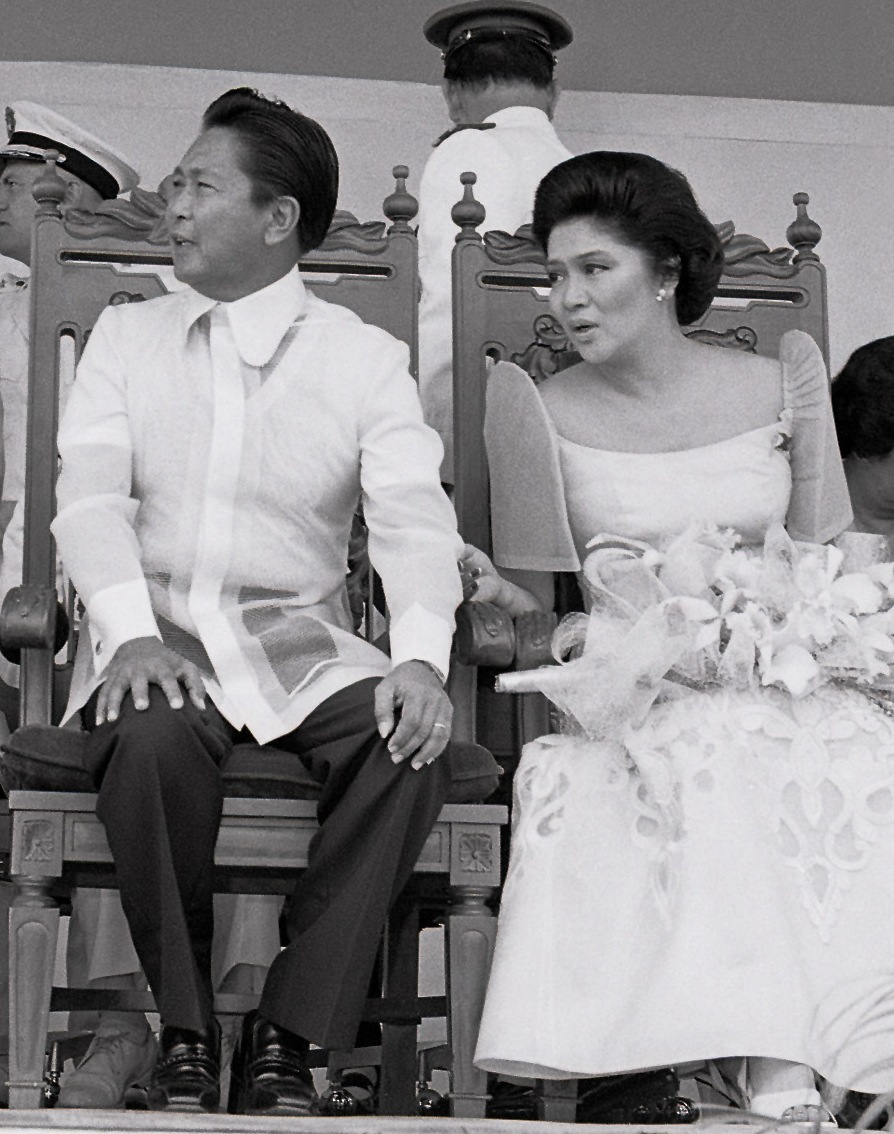
November 9, 1965: Ferdinand Marcos elected Philippine President

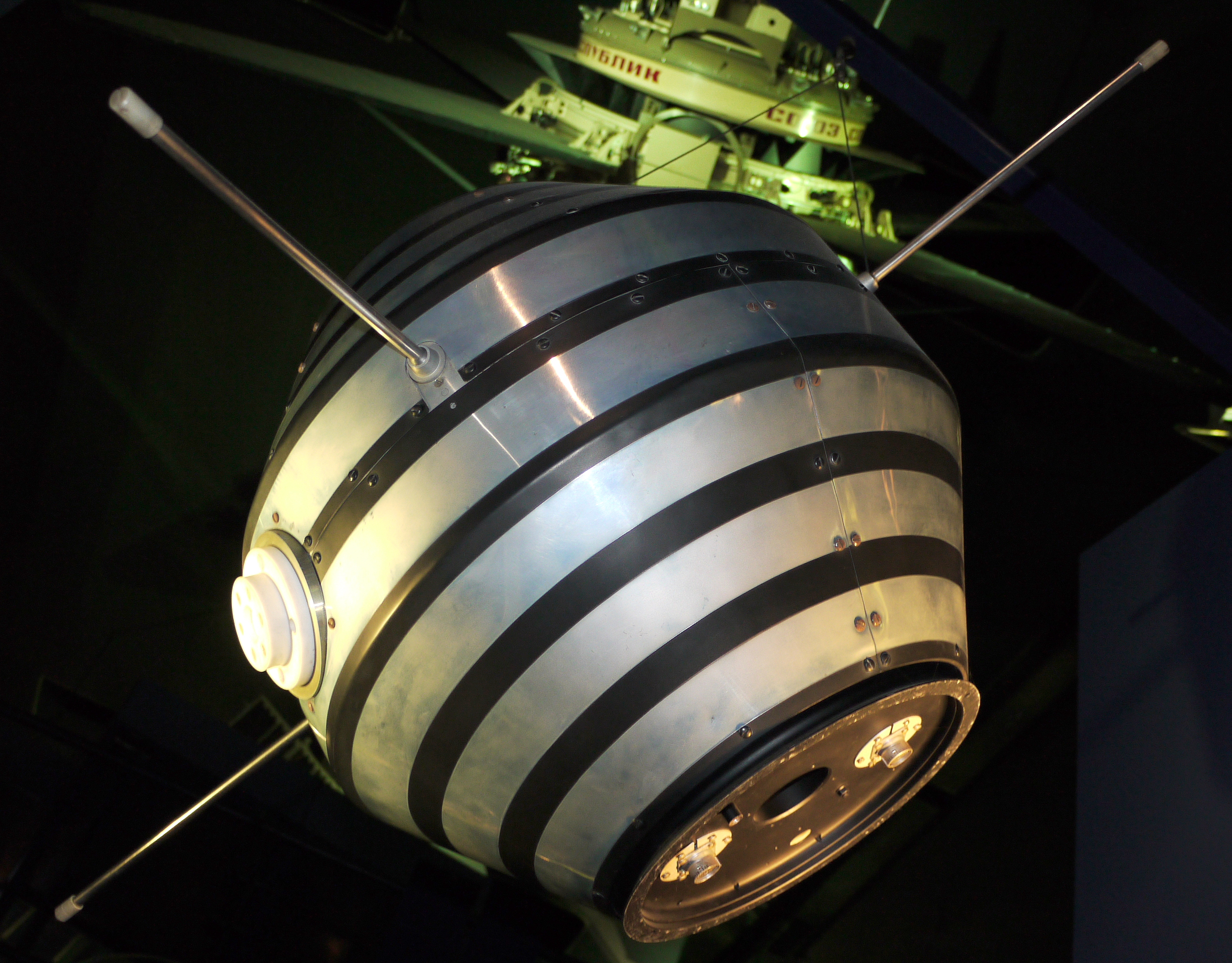
November 26, 1965: France becomes third nation to place satellite into Earth orbit, launching Astérix

The following events occurred in November 1965:

== November 1, 1965 (Monday) ==
- In Egypt, a trolleybus plunged into the Nile River at Dokki, a suburb of Cairo, drowning 74 people. Most of the dead were high school students who were on their way home from school. Only 19 passengers survived, breaking windows or escaping from open doors to free themselves.
- The charter of Asian Development Bank was drafted in Manila.
- King Mohammed Zahir Shah appointed Mohammad Hashim Maiwandwal as the new Prime Minister of Afghanistan, replacing Mohammad Yusuf, who had been dismissed the previous Friday. Maindawal, who had served as the Afghan ambassador to the United States as well as the United Kingdom and Pakistan, would serve until November 1, 1967. After Afghanistan's declaration of a republic in 1973, Maindawal would be arrested on charges of attempting to overthrow President Mohammed Daoud Khan and would die in prison.
- In advance of the Gemini 6 mission, a panel of the Agena Flight Safety Review Board reviewed Lockheed's analysis of the October 25 failure of the attempt to launch the Gemini Agena target vehicle. The subpanel concluded that a "hard start" of the Agena rocket's main engine was caused by a lead of rocket fuel, rather than oxidizer, into the rocket's thrust chamber before ignition. Meeting two days later, the full Safety Review Board, chaired by George E. Mueller, reached the same conclusion as the subpanel.

== November 2, 1965 (Tuesday) ==
- The Houston Methodist Hospital in Texas reported that it was the first to begin regular use of the new technology of "an instrument which makes possible the continuous monitoring of the vital signs of both mother and child", now commonly known as the fetal heart monitor. Initially, the instrument was used only when the mother was in labor.
- Banks and newspapers in the Dominican Republic reopened for business for the first time in more than five months. All banks in the downtown district of Santo Domingo had been closed since April 24 during the outbreak of violence following a coup, and the independent newspapers El Caribe and Listin Diario had been shut down since April 28.
- Israel's Prime Minister Levi Eshkol retained his office as parliamentary elections were held for the Knesset. Eshkol's Mapai party and its alignment with the Ahdut HaAvoda lost five seats but retained 45 of the 120 available.
- The United States Treasury Department announced an embargo, effective November 10, banning "imports of wigs made with human hair from Red China".
- Republican John Lindsay was elected Mayor of New York City, narrowly defeating Democrat challenger (and future mayor) Abe Beame.
- Born: Shah Rukh Khan, Indian film actor, producer and TV host; in New Delhi
- Died:
  - Norman Morrison, 31, American Quaker and pacifist, died of burns suffered when he set himself on fire in front of The Pentagon, in protest against the Vietnam War. Morrison was holding his one-year-old daughter as he doused himself in kerosene, and was reportedly still holding her as he began to burn, letting the child go after horrified onlookers yelled 'Drop the baby!" The child was rescued, unharmed, and Mr. Morrison was dead on arrival at the Fort Myer dispensary. Morrison had set himself ablaze 50 yards (46 m) from, and within sight of, the office of U.S. Defense Secretary Robert S. McNamara, who would write 30 years later, "Morrison's death was a tragedy not only for his family, but also for me and the country." North Vietnam would memorialize him with a postage stamp and named a street after him.
  - José Ramón Guizado, 66, 17th President of Panama for 57 days in 1955 after the assassination of President José Antonio Remón Cantera, died of a heart attack. Guizado had served two years in prison after being convicted of complicity in the 1955 murder of President José Antonio Remón Cantera, then exonerated and released.

== November 3, 1965 (Wednesday) ==
- All 69 people on an Argentine Air Force transport plane were killed when the C-54 airplane plunged into the sea while flying from Balboa-Howard Air Force Base in Panama, toward San Salvador, capital of El Salvador. The passengers were 55 Argentine Air Force cadets and five officers who were one of two groups who were en route to a tour of the United States. The aircraft was last heard from at 7:35 in the morning when the pilot sent a distress call, saying that one of the plane's engines had caught fire and that he was about 75 miles (121 km) from Puerto Limon in Costa Rica. More than 50 years later, no trace of the airplane has ever been found.
- Edward Bond's play Saved was performed for the first time, presented in its entirety in a private session by players and an audience made up of members of the English Stage Society, after Britain's Lord Chamberlain's Office had allowed only a heavily censored version for public audiences. Under the Theatres Act 1843, all scripts for British plays had to be sent to the Lord Chamberlain for approval, and even a "sanitized" version of Saved had been sent back with directions to make more than 30 cuts from the script, including entire scenes. The protest by the drama community would eventually lead to the Theatres Act 1968, abolishing censorship of plays.
- The sinking of the Jose Marti, a Cuban fishing boat, killed 39 of the 45 people on board. According to a spokesman from the Mexican Navy, the overcrowded boat, carrying refugees from Cuba,"just came to pieces" while 30 miles (48 km) short of its destination in Mexico, breaking up near Isla Contoy.
- Born: Ann Scott, French novelist; in Paris

== November 4, 1965 (Thursday) ==
- Harvard University botany professor Elso Barghoorn announced the discovery of the earliest evidence of life on Earth, with the finding of fossil evidence from three billion years in the past. Dr. Barhoorn, who was presenting his findings to the Geological Society of America at its annual convention in Kansas City, said "It proves that life must have existed much further back than any previous evidence has shown", and that the fossil had been found in February 1965, at a location in the Kingdom of Swaziland, 20 miles (32 km) southeast of Barberton in South Africa. The organisms, bacteria only one half of a micron long, were detected by electron microscope evaluation in October.
- Lee Breedlove, wife of Craig Breedlove, set a new women's land speed record of 308.56 miles per hour (496.58 km/h), based on the average between one run of 332.26 miles per hour (534.72 km/h) and another of 288.02 miles per hour (463.52 km/h). She was driving her husband's jet-powered race car, the Spirit of America, on the Bonneville Salt Flats in Utah.
- Charles de Gaulle (just short of his 75th birthday) announced that he would stand for re-election on December 5 in pursuit of another seven-year term as President of the French Republic.
- The Food and Agriculture Act of 1965 was signed into law by U.S. President Lyndon Johnson.
- Pavshie i zhivye (The Fallen and Living), by Soviet playwright Yuri Lyubimov, premiered at the Taganka Theatre in Moscow after the Ministry of Culture had ordered 19 changes in its script. By 1968, hardliners within the Communist Party would condemn even the censored version of the play as a departure from the official Party policy.
- The Ned Rorem opera Miss Julie was premiered by the New York City Opera.
- Born:
  - Wayne Static (stage name for Wayne Richard Wells), American heavy metal musician and lead vocalist for the band Static-X; in Muskegon, Michigan (died of overdose, 2014)
  - Pata (stage name for Tomoaki Ishizuka), Japanese musician best known as rhythm guitarist of the Japanese rock band X Japan; in Chiba
- Died: Dickey Chapelle, 46, American photojournalist, became the first war correspondent to be killed in the Vietnam War, and the first female American reporter to die in combat. Chapelle was mortally wounded when a land mine exploded in front of her while she was accompanying a platoon of U.S. Marines near Chu Lai.

== November 5, 1965 (Friday) ==
- A three-month state of emergency was declared in Southern Rhodesia by British colonial Governor Humphrey Gibbs, who said that the British colony's security was being threatened by Prime Minister Ian Smith's agitation for independence from the United Kingdom, and by two African nationalist organizations, Joshua Nkomo's Zimbabwe African People's Union, and Reverend Ndabaningi Sithole's Zimbabwe African National Union.
- The United Nations General Assembly voted, 82 to 9, to demand that the United Kingdom use military force if Rhodesia made a unilateral declaration of independence.
- Died: Ho Thi Que, 38, Vietnamese fighter known as "The Tiger Lady of South Vietnam", was shot and killed during an argument with her husband, Major Nguyen Van Dan.

== November 6, 1965 (Saturday) ==
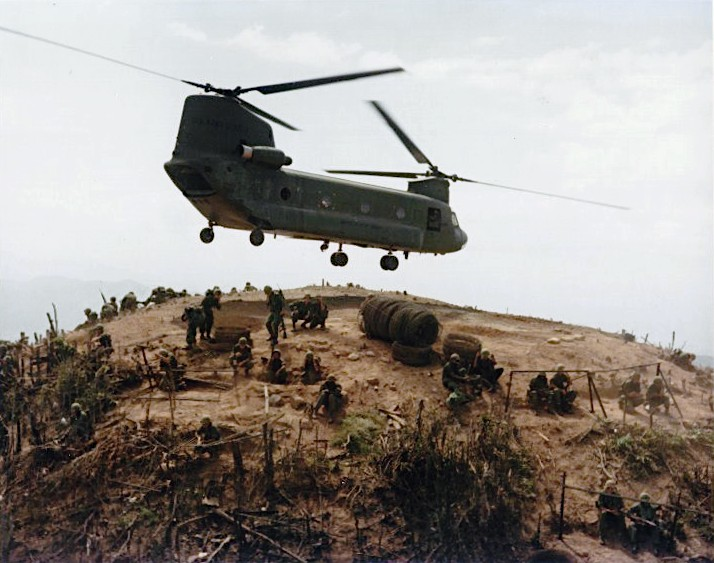
The Chinook

- The prototype of the new Chinook ACH-47A helicopter gunship was given its first test flight by Boeing Vertol. Delivery was made to the U.S. Army the following month, and a trio of the ACH-47As would enter combat in May.
- Representatives of the United States and Cuba signed a Memorandum of Understanding, brokered through the government of Switzerland, agreeing to begin "Freedom Flights" from Cuba to the U.S. for families whose names were on both nations' lists of Cuban applicants who had family in the states. Under the pact, the United States would pay for the air transport and use its own aircraft, and Cuba would allow officials of the U.S. Public Health Service and the U.S. Immigration and Naturalization Service to maintain offices at the Varadero airport to screen passengers before their embarkation. By the time of the service's end in 1971, more than 250,000 Cubans would take advantage of the program.
- The United States launched GEOS-1 (GeodeticEarth Orbiting Satellite), the first cartographic satellite, at 1:39 in the afternoon from Cape Kennedy. GEOS Project Director Jerome Rosenberg told reporters, "We've got a satellite that's just peachy-dandy", and said that it was equipped with four high-powered flashing lights, laser beam reflectors and three sets of radio gear that would provide the data to produce the most accurate maps in history, precisely locate long-range missile targets, and measure the Earth's dips and bulges with unprecedented accuracy. It was the first payload to be launched by a Delta E rocket.
- The Italian luxury ocean liner Raffaello arrived in Genoa with 56 injured passengers, six days after a fire had crippled the ship in the middle of the Atlantic Ocean.
- Troops from Chile and Argentina fought at their border in the Laguna del Desierto incident.
- Died:
  - Clarence Williams, 67, American jazz composer
  - Edgard Varèse, 81, French classical composer

== November 7, 1965 (Sunday) ==
- Parliamentary elections were held in Portugal, at the time under the dictatorship of Antonio Salazar, although the only candidates remaining on the ballot were those of Salazar's National Union Party. All candidates from opposition parties had withdrawn the previous month, charging that the elections were not democratic. Interior Minister Alfred dos Santos commented that the 70 percent turnout of the electorate was proof "that the opposition would have received only an insignificant number of votes" and that "none of their candidates would have been elected."
- The Pillsbury Company's famous mascot, the Pillsbury Doughboy (officially known as "Poppin' Fresh"), made his debut, appearing for the first time in a television commercial for dough for crescent rolls. Created by advertising executive Rudolph Perz, the TV ads used stop-motion animation that required 720 separate photographs for a 30-second film.
- The government of Israel appointed boards of trustees to administer the waqf lands released to Muslim ownership, with the first towns (Haifa, Acre, Lod and Ramla) having boards of between five and seven Muslim residents to control the lands within the restrictions of the Tel Aviv government.
- Félix Houphouët-Boigny, the first President of the Republic of Ivory Coast, was re-elected to another five-year term without opposition. He would win elections in 1970, 1975, 1980 and 1990 and continue to preside over the West African nation until his death on December 7, 1993.
- Born:
  - Sigrun Wodars, East German Olympic athlete and gold medalist in the women's 800 meters in 1988, as well as winner of the 1987 world championship; in Neu Kaliss
  - Mike Henry, American actor known for voicing Cleveland Brown on the animated sitcom Family Guy (until 2021); in Pontiac, Michigan
- Died:
  - Henry Solomons, 63, British member of the House of Commons, died in hospital on his birthday. With the death of a second Labour Party member in three months, Labour held only a 313 seats to the opposition's total of 312 in the House of Commons (Conservative 303 and Liberal 9), making the November 11 by-election even more important.
  - Herbert C. Bonner, 74, U.S. Representative for North Carolina since 1940

== November 8, 1965 (Monday) ==
- While carrying out Operation Hump, 49 members of the U.S. Army's 173rd Airborne Division were killed when their 400-member unit was ambushed by over 1,200 Viet Cong soldiers. The tragedy (and the date) would be referred to in a 2006 country music hit, "8th of November".
- American Airlines Flight 383 crashed on approach to the Greater Cincinnati Airport, killing 58 of the 62 people on board. The Boeing 727 jet had taken off from New York's La Guardia Airport and was running 20 minutes behind schedule as it approached Cincinnati in a driving rain, and burst into flames after striking a 500-foot (150 m) high wooded hillside near Constance, Kentucky at 7:02 in the evening. The U.S. Federal Aviation Agency concluded that the accident was a result of pilot error, with the crew flying "in a manner that would greatly expedite their arrival at the Cincinnati Airport" and that "both pilots became preoccupied in maintaining visual contact with the runway, resulting in inattention to and improper monitoring of the altitude reference instruments." One of the four survivors was record producer and music journalist Israel Horowitz. The site itself was on the opposite side of the Ohio River from the College of Mount Saint Joseph in Delhi Township, Ohio.
- NASA announced that Elliot M. See, Jr., had been selected as command pilot and Charles A. Bassett II as pilot for the Gemini 9 mission. The backup crew was Thomas P. Stafford and Eugene A. Cernan as command pilot and pilot. The mission for See and Bassett was scheduled for the third quarter of 1966, to last at least 48 hours and would include rendezvous and docking and extravehicular activity. Bassett was slated to remain outside the Gemini spacecraft for at least one orbit, and to wear the manned maneuvering unit backpack, a self-propelled hydrogen-peroxide system . See and Bassett would be killed in the crash of a T-38 jet trainer on February 28, 1966. Stafford and Cernan would be launched in the second quarter of 1966, on June 3, in a 72-hour mission, but would be unable dock with the Agena target vehicle.
- The British Indian Ocean Territory was created, three days after the Council of Ministers of Mauritius agreed that the other islands (the Chagos Archipelago, and three of the Seychelles Islands — Aldabra, Farquhar and Des Roches — should be a separate territory before the residents voted on independence. On June 23, 1976, when the Seychelles became an independent nation, Aldabra, Farquhar and Des Roches would be made part of that country.
- The soap opera Days of Our Lives was broadcast for the first time, on NBC television in the United States. Starring Macdonald Carey as "Dr. Thomas Horton, well-known and respected cardiologist and leading citizen in the small community of Salem", the daytime serial would continue over 50 years later to follow the problems of the Horton family. It would relocate from NBC television to NBC's Peacock video streaming service in 2022.
- Returning to the campus of his alma mater at Southwest Texas State Teachers College (now Texas State University), President Johnson signed the Higher Education Act of 1965 into law, creating a federal program of grants and government loans with the objective that no American high school graduate would be turned away from college for lack of funds.
- Voting for Canada's House of Commons took place, and although Prime Minister Lester B. Pearson's Liberal Party retained control and gained one seat, the Liberals won only 128 of the 265 seats, five short of majority. The Conservative Party of John G. Diefenbaker had 99 seats, a gain of seven.
- The Murder (Abolition of Death Penalty) Act 1965 was given Royal Assent, suspending the death penalty for murder in the United Kingdom. Renewal of the Act in 1969 would make the abolition permanent.
- Born: Patricia Poleo, Venezuelan journalist; in Caracas
- Died:
  - Mirza Basheer-ud-Din Mahmood Ahmad, 76, Indian cleric and the second Caliph of the Ahmadiyya Muslim Community, serving for more than 50 years.
  - Dorothy Kilgallen, 52, American newspaper, radio and television journalist, was found dead in her townhouse on Manhattan's East 68th Street.

== November 9, 1965 (Tuesday) ==
States and provinces affected by the blackout (in red)

- A massive electrical outage swept across nearly 80,000 square miles (207,000 square kilometers) of the northeast United States and Canada, leaving almost 30 million people in the dark or trapped inside elevators and subway trains. At 5:16 in the afternoon, one of the five electrical lines of the Adam Beck station in Queenston, Ontario, was shut down by an improperly set circuit breaker. It was determined later that engineers had set the safety shutdown of one relay at a level so close "that it would be triggered by the slightest overload" without informing the station's operators of the adjustment. A minor power surge in the surrounding area caused the breaker to trip, shifting the power of five lines to the four remaining lines, which overloaded, shifting their load to neighboring utilities and creating a cascading effect. By 5:28, power had failed in Ontario and Quebec, and the U.S. states of Connecticut, Massachusetts, New Hampshire, New Jersey, New York, Pennsylvania, Rhode Island and Vermont, including most of New York City, for as long as 13 1/2 hours.

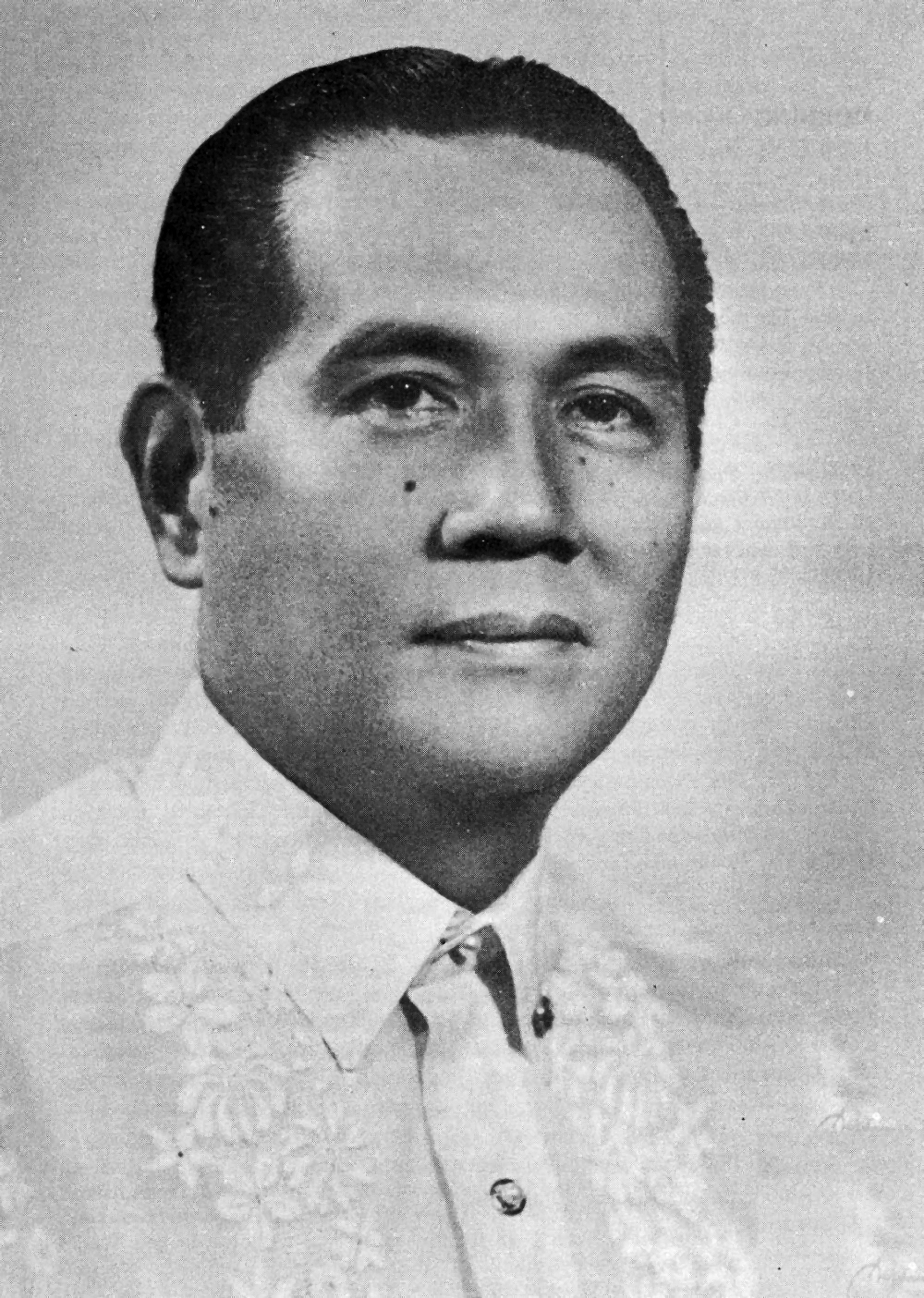
Macapagal

- In the Philippine presidential election, Ferdinand Marcos, leader of the Philippine Senate, defeated incumbent President Diosdado Macapagal. Marcos, who would assume increasingly dictatorial powers until being deposed in 1986, received 3,861,324 votes for a 51.9% majority, while President Macapagal got 3,187,752.
- Howard College, located in Birmingham, Alabama, was officially renamed Samford University at the annual meeting of the Alabama Baptist Commission. The historically white college, founded in 1842, had been named for a British philanthropist, John Howard, but the name was similar to the historically black Howard University in Washington, D.C., founded in 1867 by General Oliver O. Howard. The new name was in honor of an Alabama philanthropist, Frank P. Samford.
- Born: Bryn Terfel, Welsh operatic bass-baritone; as Bryn Terfel Jones in Pant Glas, Caernarfonshire

== November 10, 1965 (Wednesday) ==
- In Shanghai, Chinese historian and playwright Wu Han came under sharp criticism from literary critic Yao Wenyuan, who attacked Wu's popular opera, Hai Rui Dismissed from Office as having a subversive meaning. Although the opera was a historical drama based on the life of a Chinese minister who courageously criticized Emperor Jiajing 400 years earlier, Yao wrote in the cultural newspaper Wenhui bao that Wu's opera was an allegory about criticizing Communist Party leader Mao Zedong, and that "Its influence is great and its poison widespread. If we do not clean it up, it will be harmful to the affairs of the people." Yao's article initially was ignored, but would then be reprinted nationwide on November 29, making the article "the 'first bugle call' of the Cultural Revolution." Wu would become one of the first of thousands of people to be denounced and imprisoned in the years to follow.
- Died: Roger Allen LaPorte, 22, American Catholic Worker Movement member, died of burns the day after he had set himself on fire in front of the Dag Hammarskjöld Library in New York City as a protest against the Vietnam War.

== November 11, 1965 (Thursday) ==
- Prime Minister Ian Smith of Rhodesia, and the other 12 members of his white minority government cabinet, carried through with their threat to sign the Unilateral Declaration of Independence (UDI), separating the African British colony from the United Kingdom. On the first day of the secession, Smith proclaimed that the government would continue to fly the Union Jack, Britain's flag, that God Save the Queen would continue to be the national anthem, and that Queen Elizabeth would remain the monarch, but would be referred to as "Queen of Rhodesia". Hours later, the UN General Assembly voted 102–2 to condemn the UDI. For the next 14 years, Rhodesia would remain unrecognized by any other nation in the world except for the white-minority ruled nation of South Africa; finally, on December 12, 1979, a British Governor would resume administration of the state as a transition to being granted independence with a black majority governing it as Zimbabwe.
- In a by-election to fill the vacancy in Commons caused by the August death of sitting MP Norman Dodds, James Wellbeloved of the ruling Labour Party easily defeated Conservative challenger David Madel and Liberal Stanley Vince, winning 21,835 votes to their 11,763 and 2,823 in the traditionally Labour constituency of Erith and Crayford. If Madel had won, the Labour's 313 seats would have faced an opposition of 313 (304 from the Conservatives and 9 from the Liberals).
- The crash of United Airlines Flight 227 killed 43 of the 91 people on board, after the Boeing 727 fell more than 300 feet (91 m) short of the runway at Salt Lake City International Airport and caught fire. The flight had originated in New York City, with a final scheduled destination of San Francisco, but ended when the jet's pilot brought the craft in for a hard touchdown, breaking a fuel line and igniting a fire in the fuselage, before lifting up to come around for a second landing.
- Hours later on the same day, the crash of Aeroflot Flight 99 in the Soviet Union killed 32 of the 64 people on board. The Tupolev Tu-124 had departed from Leningrad and was attempting to land at Murmansk.
- Previously named "Falling Spikes", the group of Lou Reed, John Cale, Sterling Morrison and Angus Maclise played their first rock concert under their new name, The Velvet Underground.
- The government of Turkey's new Prime Minister, Süleyman Demirel, survived its first vote of confidence in the Grand National Assembly, winning approval by a 252 to 172 margin.
- Died: Bill Linderman, 45, American rodeo cowboy, was killed in the crash of United Airlines Flight 227.

== November 12, 1965 (Friday) ==
- Venera 2, the Soviet Union's second attempt to gather data on the planet Venus, was launched from the Baikonur Cosmodrome. Although Venera 2 made a flight "so accurate that no mid-course correction was needed" in order to allow a flyby of Venus, all communications were lost after ground control had given the command for photography to begin.
- The day after declaring Rhodesia's independence from the United Kingdom, Prime Minister Ian Smith issued an order removing all executive powers from the British colonial governor, Sir Humphrey Gibbs, and asked Gibbs to leave the Government House, the governor's residence.
- The United Nations Security Council voted 10–0 (with France abstaining) to adopt Resolution 217, condemning Rhodesia's declaration and calling upon all member nations not to recognize Ian Smith's regime, which the Resolution referred to as "illegal" and "racist".
- Died: Syedna Taher Saifuddin, 77, Indian Shi'ite Muslim leader and the Da'i al-Mutlaq of the Dawoodi Bohra sect since 1915

== November 13, 1965 (Saturday) ==
- British theatre critic Kenneth Tynan broke a taboo by saying "fuck" on a live television broadcast, touching off a debate in the British press about morality, censorship and social mores. Tynan was a guest on the late night (10:25) show BBC-3 when moderator Robert Robinson asked him whether, if theatrical censorship were abolished, he would allow a play depicting sexual intercourse. Tynan replied, "Oh, I think so, certainly. I doubt if there are very many rational people in this world to whom the word 'fuck' is particularly diabolical or revolting or totally forbidden." Telephone calls to BBC tied up its switchboards, four resolutions were introduced in the House of Commons condemning Tynan and the BBC, and most of the British press responded with outrage. Tynan had not been the first person to say the word on TV, in that Brendan Behan had mumbled it in 1956 on the BBC show Panorama, and a man told an Ulster TV interviewer in 1959 that his job was "fucking boring", but it was the first prominent use of that word. The BBC did not apologize, but did say that "The B.B.C. regrets the use of a word that caused offence in an unscripted part of the television programme", while Tynan responded "I used an old English word in a completely neutral way to illustrate a serious point... To have censored myself would, in my view, have been an insult to the viewers' intelligence."
- The sinking of the cruise ship SS Yarmouth Castle killed 90 people after it caught fire while 60 miles (97 km) off the Bahamas. The ship was making its semi-weekly run between Miami and Nassau when the fire broke out at around 2:00 in the morning. At 6:03, the burning liner capsized and plunged to the bottom of the Atlantic Ocean. Other ships in the area, the cruiser Bahama Star and the Finnish freighter Finnpulp rescued 459 of the 549 people on board. The blaze would later be traced to the center of the ship in "stateroom 610" which was unoccupied and being used for storage, and had started when mattresses fell over onto a lighting system. The blaze then spread in all directions through the dry wooden panels of the aging cruiser.
- A fleet of ships from the People's Liberation Army Navy of Communist China fought a battle with two Republic of China Navy ships from Taiwan. The Taiwanese gunship Yongchang and the submarine chaser Yongtai had been dispatched toward Wuqiu, Kinmen, Fujian, Republic of China (Taiwan), near the coast of China's Fujian Province, with the purpose of trying "to draw the PLA Navy into another battle" after an August 6 clash. The PLA Navy responded with six torpedo boats and ten fast-attack gunboats and, at 11:00 at night, engaged the Yongtai and damaged it. The Yongchang returned fire and damaged several PLA boats, but was finally sunk by torpedoes, while the Yongtai disengaged after thirty minutes.
- The American freighter Skipper K arrived at Key West, Florida, bringing the first 108 Cuban refugees to the United States under the agreement signed between the two nations. Earlier in the month, refugees had been departing in small boats.

== November 14, 1965 (Sunday) ==
- The Battle of the Ia Drang, the first major engagement of the war between regular United States and North Vietnam forces in the Vietnam War, began in the Ia Drang Valley of the Central Highlands in Vietnam. Over the next seven days, until the battle was concluded on November 20, there were 305 American soldiers killed in the battle, and 3,561 from the numerically superior North Vietnamese Army. The battle marked the first time that U.S. forces used B-52 bombers (and their 36,000 pounds (16,000 kg) of explosives) in a tactical role. A historian would note that the battle "was of critical importance, as it set the precedent for the conduct of the war in Vietnam. The air mobility concept had proved its worth. In addition, [General William] Westmoreland believed that the Ia Drang validated his strategy of attrition... that it would not take many more such victories to push the Communists to the brink of defeat." On the other hand, the General Vo Nguyen Giap of the NVA felt that the battle was "something of a victory because they learned that they could in fact fight the Americans." The North Vietnamese also concluded "that direct, prolonged exposure in firefights was not a sound strategy" and that guerrilla warfare would be more effective than large scale battles. In 2002, the battle would be dramatized in the film We Were Soldiers.
- The recently formed coalition government of Congolese Prime Minister Évariste Kimba failed a vote of confidence in the Congo Parliament, losing 72–76 in the lower house and 49–58 in the upper house, despite the inclusion of 16 political parties in the cabinet. Interior Minister Victor Nendaka Bika was asked to form a new government, but before he could do so, Major General Joseph Mobutu overthrew the government on November 24.

== November 15, 1965 (Monday) ==
- Entertainment mogul Walt Disney and Florida Governor Haydon Burns appeared at a press conference in Orlando, where the master showman unveiled his plans for a $100,000,000 family attraction on 27,000 acres (11,000 ha) of land adjacent to Bay Lake in Orange County, Florida. Disney's initial vision for his planned "Disney World" was to build two communities which would be called "City of Tomorrow" and "City of Yesterday" and that would exclude motor vehicles other than the parking area for park patrons. Governor Burns told reporters that it was "the most significant day in the history of Florida". The "City of Yesterday" would open in 1971 as the "Magic Kingdom" section of Disney World, while the City of Tomorrow would open in 1982 as the "Experimental Prototype Community of Tomorrow", or Epcot.
- The United States Supreme Court ruled, 8–0, that the Subversive Activities Control Act of 1950 was unconstitutional, and struck down a requirement that members of the Communist Party must register with the U.S. Department of Justice. With Justice Byron White abstaining, the Court held unanimously that the law violated the protections within the Fifth Amendment against self-incrimination.
- American auto racer Craig Breedlove became the first person to drive an automobile faster than 600 miles per hour (970 km/h), setting a new land speed record of 600.601 mph (966.574 km/h) in his Spirit of America vehicle at the Bonneville Salt Flats in Utah.
- The Sprint (Solid propellant rocket interceptor), a short-range anti-ballistic missile intended to intercept an incoming enemy missile that might get past the Nike Zeus defense, was launched for the first time, in a test firing from the White Sands Missile Range in New Mexico.

== November 16, 1965 (Tuesday) ==
- An arrest in Merced, California, revealed the lax security at the Castle Air Force Base, part of the U.S. Air Force's Strategic Air Command. The Merced County Sheriff's office would reveal on December 1 what it called "The Case of the Crying Colonel", and the perpetrators of the breach were three junior high school students, two of whom were 13 years old, and their 14-year-old companion. The eldest boy, who "was wearing the complete flying uniform of a lieutenant colonel" when he led police on a high-speed chase in a truck stolen from the base, told police that he and his friends had pedaled their bicycles to Castle AFB, driven a base vehicle to the officers club and stole uniforms and insignia, then returned a few days later dressed as officers, even being saluted as they drove two trucks off of the base. When they were stopped after their third visit, they were found with documents (including flight orders), radio-equipped pilot helmets, and "pieces of nine air force uniforms." The federal government would decline to press charges because of the boys' ages.
- Four days after launching Venera 2 toward Venus, the Soviet Union launched the Venera 3 space probe toward the same planet, marking the first time that the Soviets had sent two interplanetary probes at roughly the same time. On March 1, 1966, Venera 3 would become the first Earth spacecraft to reach the surface of another planet.
- Britain's House of Commons and House of Lords passed a bill giving Prime Minister Harold Wilson authority to rule the African colony of Rhodesia by decree, and Queen Elizabeth II gave formal assent on the same day so that the emergency measure would become law. Hours later, as Governor Humphrey Gibbs was awaiting an urgent phone call from Prime Minister Wilson, the phone lines to his residence were cut off by order of Ian Smith.
- Died:
  - W. T. Cosgrave, 85, the first Prime Minister of Ireland (as President of the Executive Council of the Irish Free State), from 1922 to 1932
  - Harry Blackstone Sr., 80, American stage musician and illusionist billed as "The Great Blackstone"

== November 17, 1965 (Wednesday) ==
- The United Nations General Assembly voted on a resolution on whether to admit the People's Republic of China (PRC) as a member. Prior to the vote, the United States and 10 other nations offered a resolution, which passed 56–49, to declare Chinese representation "an important question". Because of the designation as important, the admission of Communist China would require a two-thirds majority, and the result was 47 in favor, 47 opposed, and 20 abstentions. The 47–47 tie, still short of the 64 that would have been required, was more favorable to the PRC than the last vote on October 21, 1963, which had failed, 41–57. As one historian would note later, "The UN vote was a sobering reminder that many countries no longer tolerated Washington's unbending hostility toward Beijing."
- The 27 passengers and 11 crewmen of the Boeing 707 nicknamed "Polecat" landed in Honolulu at 10:21 in the morning, a little more than 62 hours after departing from the same airport on the first flight around the world to pass over both the North Pole and the South Pole. Led by pilot Jack Martin, the circumpolar expedition had started from Honolulu at 7:15 on a Sunday evening. One of the reporters on board, Lowell Thomas Jr. (who broadcast to radio listeners along the way), would recount later that "In all, we traveled 26,230 miles (42,210 km)", with a total time of 62:27:35 and actual time in the air at 51 hours, 27 minutes. The jet had gone from Honolulu to London by way of the North Pole, with more refueling stops at Lisbon, Buenos Aires, and Auckland before arriving at Hawaii.
- The economic term "stagflation" was used for the first time, by British MP Iain Macleod, as a portmanteau of the words "stagnation" and "inflation". Macleod was speaking to the House of Commons about the British economy, noting that "We now have the worst of both worlds— not just inflation on the one side or stagnation on the other side, but both of them together. We have a sort of 'stagflation' problem."
- Born: Pam Bondi, American attorney, lobbyist and politician, 87th U.S. Attorney General (2025–present), in Tampa, Florida

== November 18, 1965 (Thursday) ==
- The Second Vatican Council voted to approve two significant changes in Roman Catholic Church doctrine, approving Dei verbum (the Dogmatic Constitution on Divine Revelation) by a vote of 2,344 to 6, and Apostolicam Actuositatem (the Decree on the Apostolate of the Laity) by a margin of 2,340 to 6.
- A barge containing 602 tonnes (592 long tons; 664 short tons) of chlorine gas in cylinders, sunk two months earlier near Baton Rouge, Louisiana, by Hurricane Betsy, was recovered without any harmful effects.
- John H. Disher of NASA requested a change of the name of the Saturn IB/Centaur Office to Saturn Applications (a reference to missions using the Saturn rocket, rather than to the planet Saturn). On the same day, however, Disher ordered a halt on all Saturn IB/Centaur efforts, except for those already underway, and rejected a request for an additional $1.1 million for the program.
- Died: Henry A. Wallace, 77, Vice President of the United States from 1941 to 1945) and former U.S. Secretary of Agriculture from 1933 to 1941 during the administration of President Franklin D. Roosevelt.

== November 19, 1965 (Friday) ==
- Anthony Greenwood, the British Secretary of State for the Colonies, announced that the colony of British Guiana would be granted independence on May 26, 1966. Greenwood added that although Prime Minister Forbes Burnham would become head of government for the new nation (which would rename itself Guyana), Queen Elizabeth II would continue to be represented by a Governor-General until the end of 1968, at which time all parties agreed that the South American nation could opt to become a presidential republic.
- The Vatican Ecumenical Council voted 1,954 to 249 to give final approval for the Declaration on Religious Liberty issued by the Roman Catholic Church, with a statement recognizing that no person should be forced to act against conscience in matters of faith, nor be prevented from practicing a personal religious belief. The declaration, which would be promulgated by Pope Paul VI on December 7, ended any official objection by the Catholic church to Protestant Christian denominations.
- Born:
  - Laurent Blanc, French footballer and football manager, defender for the France national team from 1989 to 2000; in Alès, Gard département
  - Paulo S. L. M. Barreto, Brazilian cryptographer; in Salvador, Bahia

== November 20, 1965 (Saturday) ==
- Michigan State University, ranked #1 in both the Associated Press and United Press International polls, won a share of the unofficial U.S. college football championship, defeating #4 Notre Dame, 12–3, to complete its regular season with an unbeaten 10–0–0 record. At season's end, the final UPI poll of coaches would declare the Michigan State Spartans the nation's top college football team. The final AP poll of sportswriters, however, would not be taken until after the postseason bowl games, and Michigan State's 14–12 loss in the Rose Bowl, #2 Arkansas' 14–7 loss in the Cotton Bowl, and #4 Alabama's 39–28 win over #3 Nebraska would result in Alabama being declared the national champion by the Associated Press.
- The first national college football championship game in Canada, inaugural Canadian College Bowl for the Vanier Cup, was played at Varsity Stadium in Toronto, with the Varsity Blues of the University of Toronto defeating the Golden Bears of the University of Alberta, 14–7. The Vanier Cup had been inaugurated as an invitational bowl game to raise money for the Save the Children Fund to pit the champions of the Western Canadian conference (the Hardy Trophy winner) against the Yates Cup winner from the Ontario Universities conference.
- Simon Pierre Tchoungui became the third and final Prime Minister of East Cameroon during the 11-year period when the Federal Republic of Cameroon had separate cabinets for the East and West portions of the African nation. Tchoungui, who replaced Vincent de Paul Ahanda, would serve until the separate premierships were abolished on June 2, 1972, with the creation of the United Republic of Cameroon.
- Born:
  - Yoshiki, Japanese heavy metal musician and co-founder of the group X Japan; in Tateyama, Chiba
  - Mike D (stage name for Michael Diamond), American rapper and co-founder of the Beastie Boys; in New York City

== November 21, 1965 (Sunday) ==
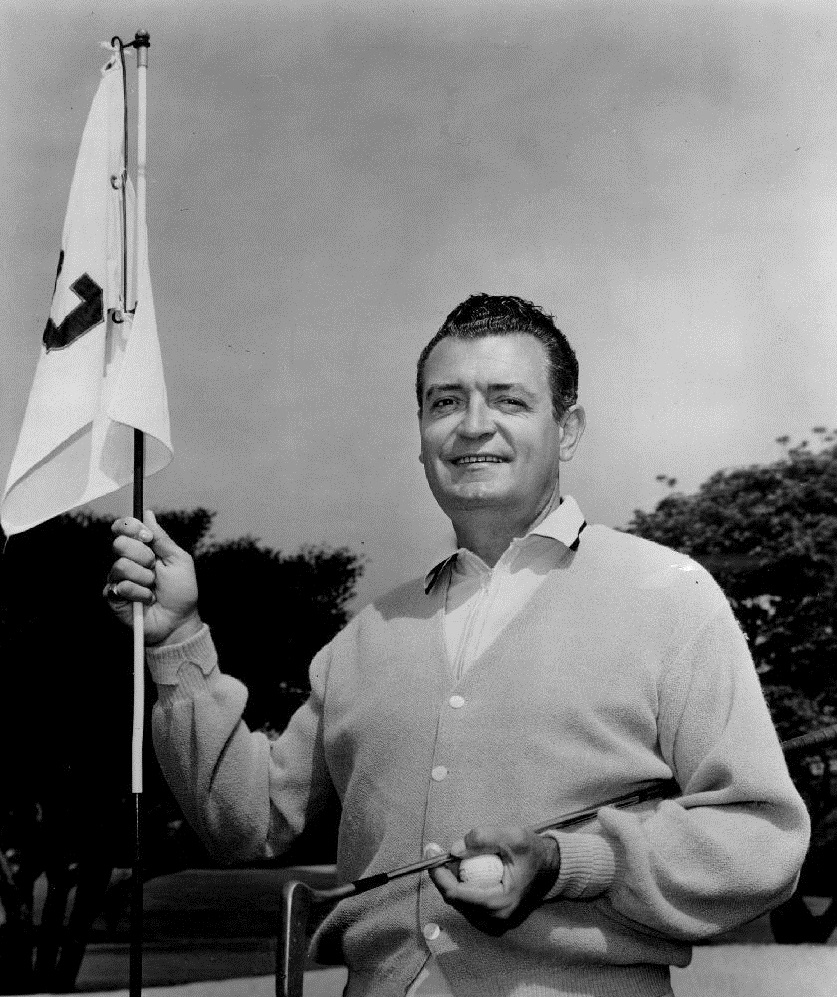
Hearn

- Radio broadcaster Francis "Chick" Hearn did his first play-by-play reporting of a Los Angeles Laker basketball game (a 110–104 loss to the Philadelphia Warriors), the first of 3,338 consecutive game calls. Hearn's streak would last past his 85th birthday, until December 16, 2001, three days before scheduled open-heart surgery. He would return in April 2002, calling the play by play at the Lakers' June 12 NBA championship winning game over the New Jersey Nets, but died on August 5, before the start of the next NBA season. Hearn is credited by historians with introducing the terms "slam dunk" and "air ball" (for a missed free throw), and the phrase "no harm, no foul".
- After 84 days of preparation, the six F-100-F crews who were designated as the "Wild Weasels" strike force, were deployed in Vietnam to locate and destroy enemy radar sites.
- Che Guevara and the last six survivors of his column of Cuban guerrillas withdrew from the Republic of the Congo after an unsuccessful attempt to aid the revolution there.
- Pope Paul VI closed the deliberations of the Second Vatican Council, and more than 2,300 Roman Catholic archbishops and clergy from all over the world.
- Mireille Mathieu performed on France's Télé-Dimanche and began her successful singing career.
- Born:
  - Alexander Siddig, Sudanese-born British television and film actor, known for portraying Dr. Bashir on Star Trek: Deep Space Nine; as Siddiq at-Tahir el-Fadil in Khartoum
  - Björk Guðmundsdóttir, Icelandic singer-songwriter; in Reykjavík
  - Yuriko Yamaguchi, Japanese anime voice actress; in Osaka
- Died: Cecil Brower, 50, American country music fiddler and pioneer of the "Western swing" genre, died of a perforated ulcer following a Carnegie Hall concert with Jimmy Dean's band.

== November 22, 1965 (Monday) ==
- Muhammad Ali, who had converted to Islam and changed his former name of Cassius Clay, successfully defended his world heavyweight boxing championship against a former world champion, Floyd Patterson, who had held the title from 1956 to 1959 and again from 1960 to 1962. Patterson, who had promoted the Las Vegas fight as a war over the values of Christianity vs. Islam, lost in the 12th round on a technical knockout.
- The United States Supreme Court selected four similar petitions for a writ of certiorari to review the issue of the right of an indigent criminal defendant to have an attorney appointed for him at government expense, including that of Ernesto Miranda. What would become known as the "Miranda warning" could have easily been the "Westover warning" or the "Vignera warning", but Miranda's arguments were heard first and the Court's landmark decision of June 13, 1966, would be styled Miranda v. Arizona.
- The musical Man of La Mancha opened off-Broadway at the ANTA Washington Square Theatre in New York City's Greenwich Village and would become a major hit, running for 2,328 performances and winning a Tony Award for its star, Richard Kiley.
- The United Nations Development Programme (UNDP) was established as a specialized agency of the United Nations. Paul G. Hoffman would be its first administrator.
- David M. Jones, Acting Saturn/Apollo Applications Director, asked the leaders of aerospace companies contracting with NASA for their views on proposed goals for the Apollo Applications Program. Various objectives suggested were to "explore and utilize world resources for the benefit of humanity'; "develop the operational capabilities for the next generation of space vehicles beyond Apollo"; "broaden knowledge of near-Earth and lunar environments"; 'enhance the national security of the United States through space operations" and "develop the capability for crewed flights of up to one year." NASA would include the cost/benefit assessments in congressional hearings early in 1966.
- Born: Mads Mikkelsen, Denmark-born film and television actor; in Copenhagen
- Died:
  - Dipa Nusantara Aidit, 42, senior leader of the Communist Party of Indonesia, was killed the day after being arrested by the Indonesian national police. The government maintained that he was killed while trying to escape rather than to be tried and sentenced to death, while other reports were that he was promised a trip to Jakarta and then taken to an isolated location and shot to death.
  - Otto Kirchheimer, 60, German jurist and political scientist who worked for the U.S. Office of Strategic Services during World War II and later for the Central Intelligence Agency, died of a heart attack while attempting to board a flight at Dulles International Airport in Washington.

== November 23, 1965 (Tuesday) ==
- After reaching a tentative agreement to end the Yemen Civil War by holding a plebiscite for voters to decide on whether Yemen should be a republic or a monarchy, representatives of the Yemen Arab Republic and of the former Kingdom of Yemen met at the Yemeni town of Harad to discuss how the election would be organized, but would never reach an agreement.
- Born: Don Frye, American mixed martial artist, professional wrestler, boxer and kickboxer; in Sierra Vista, Arizona

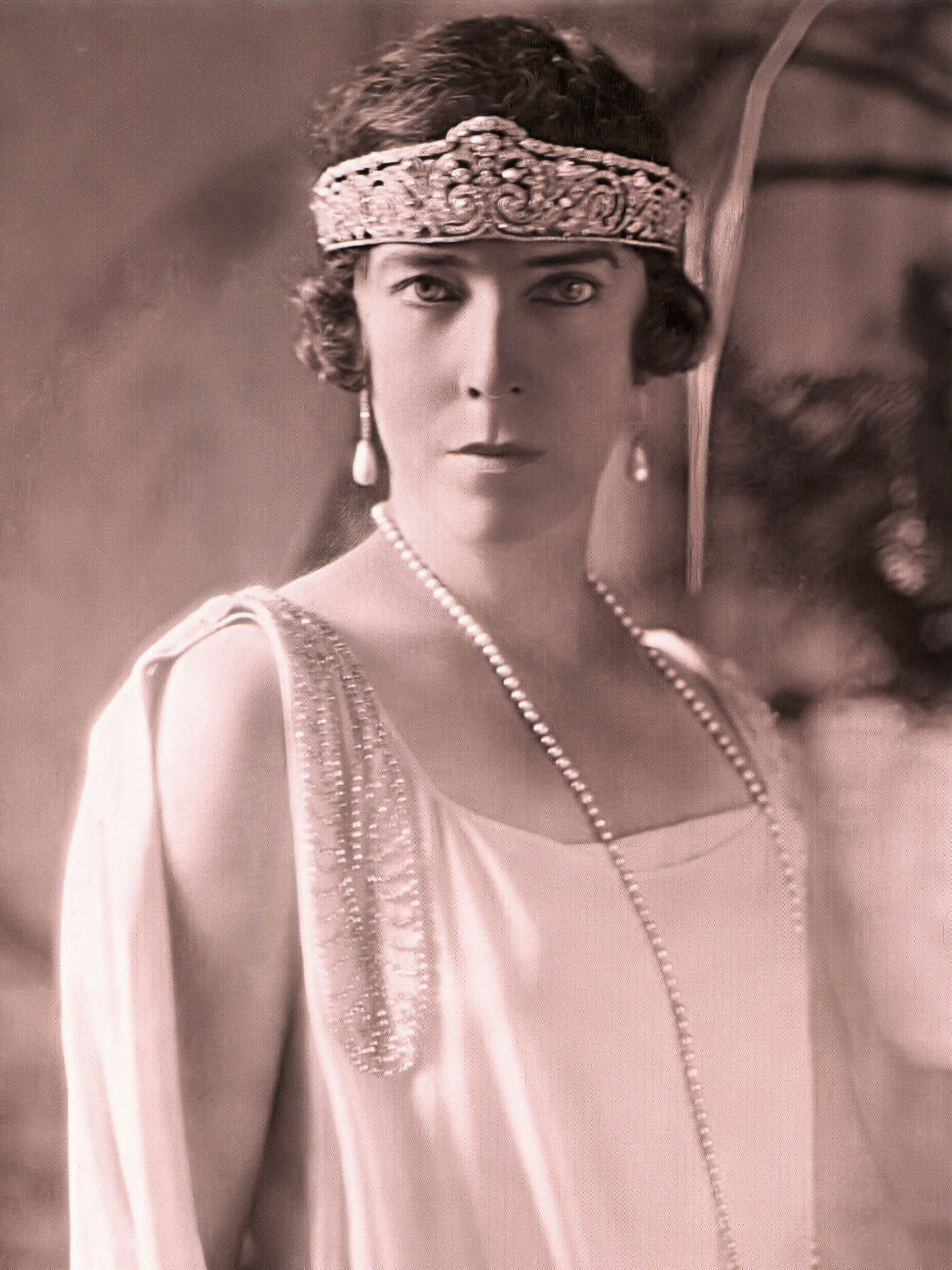
Elisabeth

- Died: Elisabeth of Bavaria, Queen of Belgium, 89, queen consort during the reign of her husband, King Albert I, from 1909 to 1934, mother of King Leopold III and grandmother of King Baudoin I. During World War I, when her native land of Germany invaded Belgium, she established surgical centers for the Belgian soldiers at the front lines, and during World War II, she helped numerous Belgians, particularly Belgian Jews, escape from Nazi occupiers; the city of Elisabethville in the Belgian Congo was named in her honor, and would be renamed Lubumbashi a year after her death.

== November 24, 1965 (Wednesday) ==
- At the age of 35, Lieutenant General Joseph-Desiré Mobutu met with 14 fellow members of the Armée Nationale Congolaise high command in Léopoldville in an emergency session and decided to break the deadlock between the Congolese Parliament and President Kasavubu by staging a bloodless coup d'état. By dawn the next morning, the Army had seized Radio Leopoldville and it was announced that Mobutu declared himself to be the new President of the Democratic Republic of Congo and had removed Kasuvubu and Prime Minister Kimba from office. During his 31-year rule, Mobutu would dismiss the parliament, suspend the constitution, ban all political parties in favor of the Mouvement Populaire de la Révolution, promote himself with a personality cult, inaugurate his own authenticité campaign, rename the nation to Zaire and require his citizens to adopt "African" names (including calling himself Mobutu Sese Seko), and amass a large personal fortune while bankrupting his country. Mobutu's rule would end on May 16, 1997; he would flee into exile in the face of an invasion by rebel forces, and die of prostate cancer less than four months later.
- A United States military spokesman reported that 240 American servicemen had been killed in the Vietnam War during the week of November 14 to November 20, in the deadliest week of the war for Americans up to that time. During the four years of 1961, 1962, 1963 and 1964, there had been 244 U.S. deaths, only slightly more than the casualties for the week. The newest casualties raised the toll to 1,335 dead and 6,131 wounded.
- An explosion and fire killed 21 people and injured 33, in a crowded national guard armory in Keokuk, Iowa, where they were attending a square dance. The cause of the accident was later traced to natural gas that had leaked into the building through porous rock beneath the tile in the armory, and that had been ignited when a space heater had been turned on.
- Died: Abdullah III Al-Salim Al-Sabah, 70, Emir of Kuwait since 1950. He was succeeded as King by his brother, Prime Minister Sabah Al-Salim Al-Sabah, who took the constitutional oath of office on November 27.

== November 25, 1965 (Thursday) ==
- General Lon Nol, Chief of Staff of the Royal Cambodian Army, concluded an agreement with Luo Ruiqing, the Chief of Staff of China's People's Liberation Army, stipulating that Cambodia would permit the passage of Viet Cong and North Vietnamese Army troops through its border regions, and that it would allow China to ship war supplies to Vietnam through Cambodian territory. Lon Nol had traveled to Beijing at the request of Prince Norodom Sihanouk.
- In his first electoral test since being appointed Prime Minister of Northern Ireland in 1963, Terence O'Neill increased his hold on power in the elections for the Parliament of Northern Ireland. O'Neill's Ulster Unionist Party won 36 of the 52 available seats to obtain a 59% majority, up from a 48.8% plurality before the vote.
- The Army of Peru began redeployment to the Ayacucho Region of Peru in order to surround rebel guerrillas of the Ejército de Liberación Nacional (ELN), the "National Liberation Army" movement that had been fighting the government since 1962.
- Born:
  - Cris Carter, American NFL receiver and Hall of Fame member; in Troy, Ohio
  - Tim Armstrong, American punk rock musician for the band Rancid; in Albany, California
- Died: Dame Myra Hess, 75, English pianist

== November 26, 1965 (Friday) ==
- France became the third nation to place a spacecraft into orbit around the Earth, as it launched a 40 kilograms (88 lb) satellite, Astérix, from the CIEES launch facility in Hammaguir, Algeria. The primary mission of the Asterix probe, which carried radio and radar transmitters, was to test the effectiveness of the Diamant-A rocket. Although France was the third nation to launch its own satellite, the United Kingdom, Canada and Italy had each contracted with the United States to send spacecraft into orbit from Cape Canaveral, Florida. "Unfortunately," an author would note later, "the satellite only operated for two days. A-1 is still in orbit and will be for centuries to come, since an antenna malfunction does not allow any commands to the satellite."
- Webster Bivens was arrested by a team of FBI agents who entered his Brooklyn apartment and searched the premises without a search warrant, giving rise to a landmark U.S. Supreme Court decision in 1971 in the case of Bivens v. Six Unknown Named Agents. The Court would rule that, although there was no specific federal law that permitted Bivens to file suit against the government for a violation of his Fourth Amendment protections against unreasonable searches and seizures, the constitutional amendment itself provided an implied right of action. The Court precedent would extend to similar interpretations of other Bill of Rights guarantees.
- McDonnell Aircraft Corporation proposed building a backup target vehicle for Gemini rendezvous missions. The augmented target docking adapter (ATDA) would be a replacement for the Gemini Agena target vehicle (GATV), which had failed its first launch attempt, and would be in place if the GATV was not fixed by the launch date of Gemini 8. NASA approved the ATDA proposal on December 9, and McDonnell began assembling it December 14.
- Born: Scott Adsit, American actor, comedian, and writer, known for the TV show 30 Rock; in Northbrook, Illinois
- Died: William C. Marland, 47, former Governor of West Virginia (1953–1957) who had suffered from alcoholism, and who later worked as a taxicab driver in Chicago (1962–1965) during his recovery.

== November 27, 1965 (Saturday) ==
- Officials from the Pentagon told U.S. President Lyndon B. Johnson that if planned major sweep operations to neutralize Viet Cong forces during the next year were to succeed, the number of American troops in Vietnam would have to be increased more than three times, from 120,000 to 400,000.
- In an act which it said was being done as a "response to the friendly sentiments of the American people against the war in South Vietnam", the Viet Cong released U.S. Army Sergeant George E. Smith and Specialist E-5 Claude E. McClure, who had both been captured on November 24, 1963. Vietnam Communist Party official Le Duc Tho escorted Smith and McClure across the border from North Vietnam into Cambodia, freeing both men after two years as prisoners of war. Smith and McClure would travel across neutral Cambodia on their own and would address a press conference in Phnom Penh on November 30, praising their captors and American antiwar protesters, and criticizing the war effort. On December 27, the U.S. military command announced that Smith and McClure would face court martial for aiding the enemy.
- The entire 7th ARVN Regiment of the South Vietnamese Army was killed in a battle with Viet Cong and North Vietnamese Army troops who surrounded the 1,000-man unit at the Michelin rubber plantation in the Dau Tieng district of South Vietnam. Associated Press photographer Horst Faas would begin his report the next day with the words, "South Viet Nam's 7th regiment died at 8 a.m. yesterday," and note that "Most of the Vietnamese troopers, with their American advisers, fought to the last bullet." People taken prisoner were gathered together and machine-gunned.
- The "March on Washington for Peace in Vietnam", organized by the "Committee for a SANE Nuclear Policy" (SANE), attracted a crowd of almost 35,000 demonstrators who picketed the White House, then moved on toward the Washington Monument. It was the largest public protest against U.S. involvement in Vietnam up to that time. The leaders of SANE were concerned about the public perception of the antiwar movement, so they asked that protesters only carry signs with "authorized slogans", and not to demand immediate withdrawal, nor to burn the American flag.
- Died: Marion Probert, 32, American football player and surgeon; in a plane crash

== November 28, 1965 (Sunday) ==
- What was described as "an unprecedented mass meeting of racial unity in the South" took place in Charlotte, North Carolina, as an evenly split crowd of 2,000 white and African-American community leaders, church officials, businessmen, and professionals gathered in an auditorium to condemn the bombing of four black leaders' homes the previous Monday, belonging to a city councilman, a U.S. commissioner, a physician, and the state NAACP chapter president. During the televised event, NAACP Executive Secretary Roy Wilkins, and Charlotte Mayor Stan Brookshire told the crowd that "We will intensify our efforts to provide equal rights for all." After the group, "about evenly split between whites and Negroes" sang and prayed, one black leader noted, "I've never seen anything like it in the South."
- Léonard Mulamba (later Mulamba Nyunyi wa Kadima) was appointed the new Prime Minister of the Congo by President Mobutu, but would serve less than a year. Mobutu would later send Mulamba as an ambassador to India, then Japan, and Brazil.
- In response to U.S. President Lyndon B. Johnson's call for "more flags" in Vietnam, Philippines President-elect Ferdinand Marcos announced that he would send troops to help fight in South Vietnam.
- Born: Matt Williams, American baseball player; in Bishop, California

== November 29, 1965 (Monday) ==
- The United States and all but five members of the United Nations General Assembly voted in favor of a UN resolution calling for a world disarmament conference that would include an invitation to the People's Republic of China, whose admission to the UN had been opposed by the U.S. and other western nations. The vote of participants was a unanimous 112–0. France abstained, Taiwan's delegation announced that it would not participate, and the delegations of Cambodia, The Gambia, and Paraguay were absent.
- What had started on November 10 as a criticism of Chinese playwright Wu Han in an obscure Shanghai newspaper was published across the People's Republic by order of Chairman Mao Zedong, in Peking's daily newspaper, Beijing Ribao and the People's Liberation Army Daily (Jiefangjun Bao). The next day, the official Chinese Communist Party newspaper, People's Daily (Renmin Ribao), published the criticism as well.
- General Christophe Soglo removed Sourou-Migan Apithy from his job as President of Dahomey (now Benin) and temporarily replaced him with National Assembly Speaker Tahirou Congacou, whom he would remove on December 22.
- Plans were formalized for allowing the Gemini 7 astronauts to remove their G5C pressure suits while in orbit, during orbital flight in Gemini 7. Both Frank Borman and Jim Lovell had made the unprecedented request to be permitted to work without the uncomfortable pressure suits after the second sleep period, and to wear them only during rendezvous and reentry. The change approved for December 4 was to require at all times that at least one astronaut to be suited, but on December 12, NASA Headquarters authorized both crew members to have their suits off at the same time.
- The Canadian satellite Alouette 2 was launched from Vandenberg Air Force Base in California.
- Born: Lauren Child, English children's author and illustrator, known for her Charlie and Lola and Clarice Bean book series; in Berkshire

== November 30, 1965 (Tuesday) ==
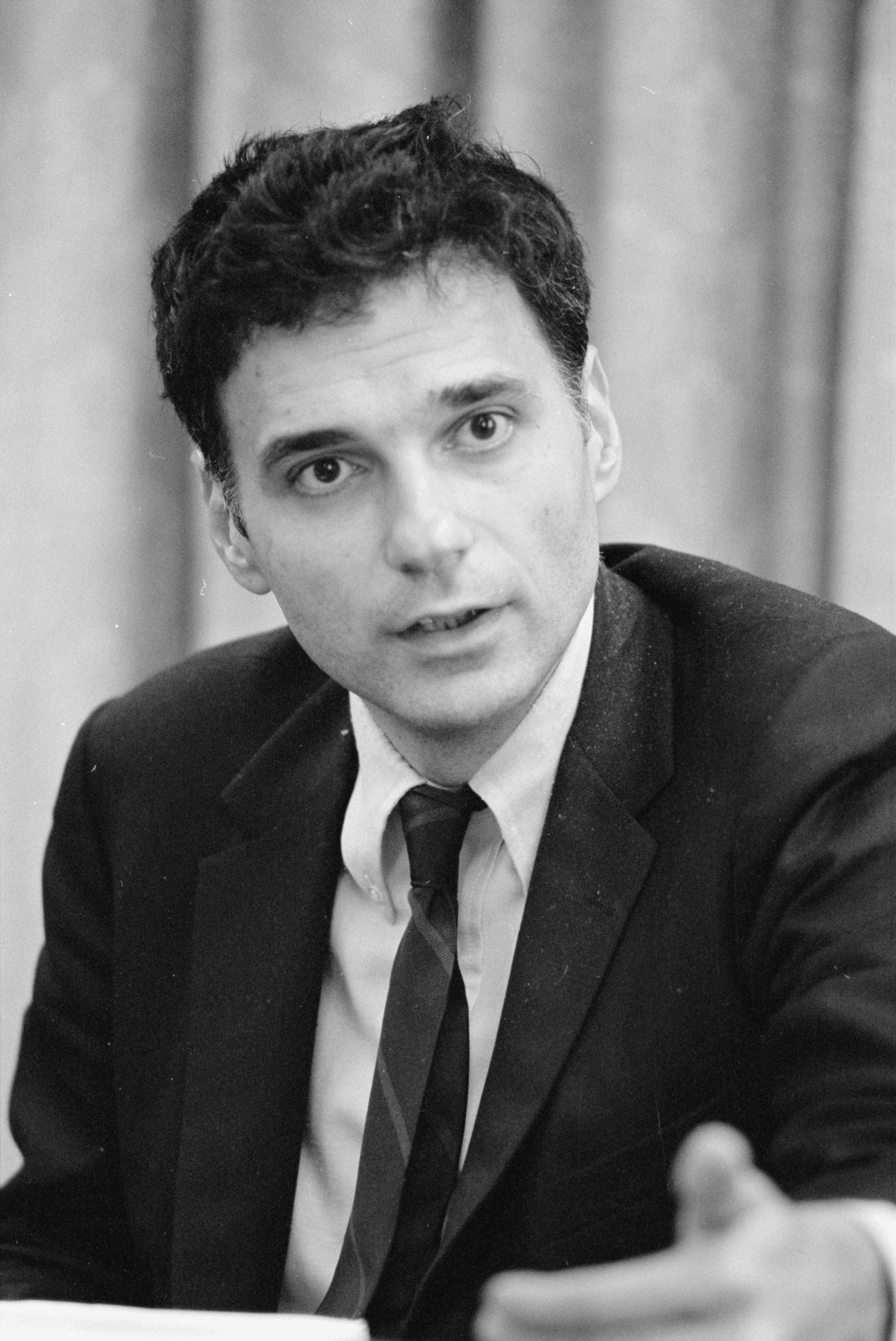
Ralph Nader

- Unsafe at Any Speed, the exposé by attorney and auto safety advocate Ralph Nader, was released by Grossman Publishers and became a bestseller. The most dangerous cars on the road were identified by Nader, with special attention given to models of the Chevrolet Corvair. Nader criticized both the American auto industry and federal government agencies that were trusted with enforcing motor vehicle safety.
- Temple University, the second-largest private university in the United States, became a public university within Pennsylvania's Commonwealth System of Higher Education, joining Penn State and Pitt as state-supported institutions. Tuition was cut by more than half for Pennsylvania residents, and increased by almost 20% for non-residents.
- SEAMEO, the Southeast Asian Ministers of Education Organization, was established to promote cooperation in education, science, and culture in the Southeast Asian region.
- Born:
  - Ben Stiller, American actor, filmmaker, and comedian; in New York City
  - Fumihito, Prince Akishino, Japanese prince and, as brother of Naruhito, Crown Prince of Japan, the second in line for the Imperial throne; in Chiyoda, Tokyo
- Died: Walter Inglis Anderson, 62, American painter
