= October 1965 =

Month of 1965

<<	October 1965					>>
Su	Mo	Tu	We	Th	Fr	Sa
					1	2
3	4	5	6	7	8	9
10	11	12	13	14	15	16
17	18	19	20	21	22	23
24	25	26	27	28	29	30
31

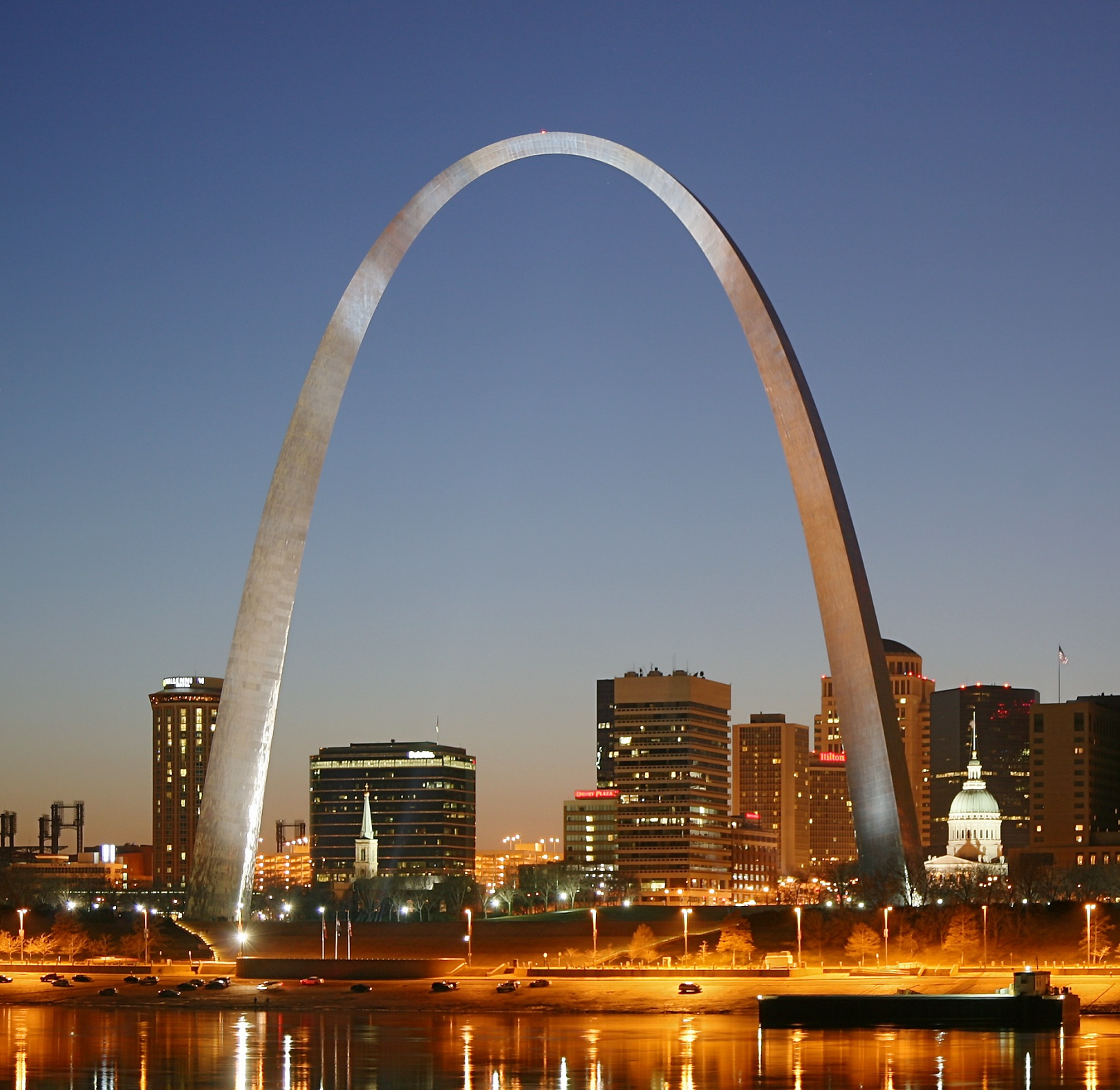
October 28, 1965: Gateway Arch completed in St. Louis, Missouri

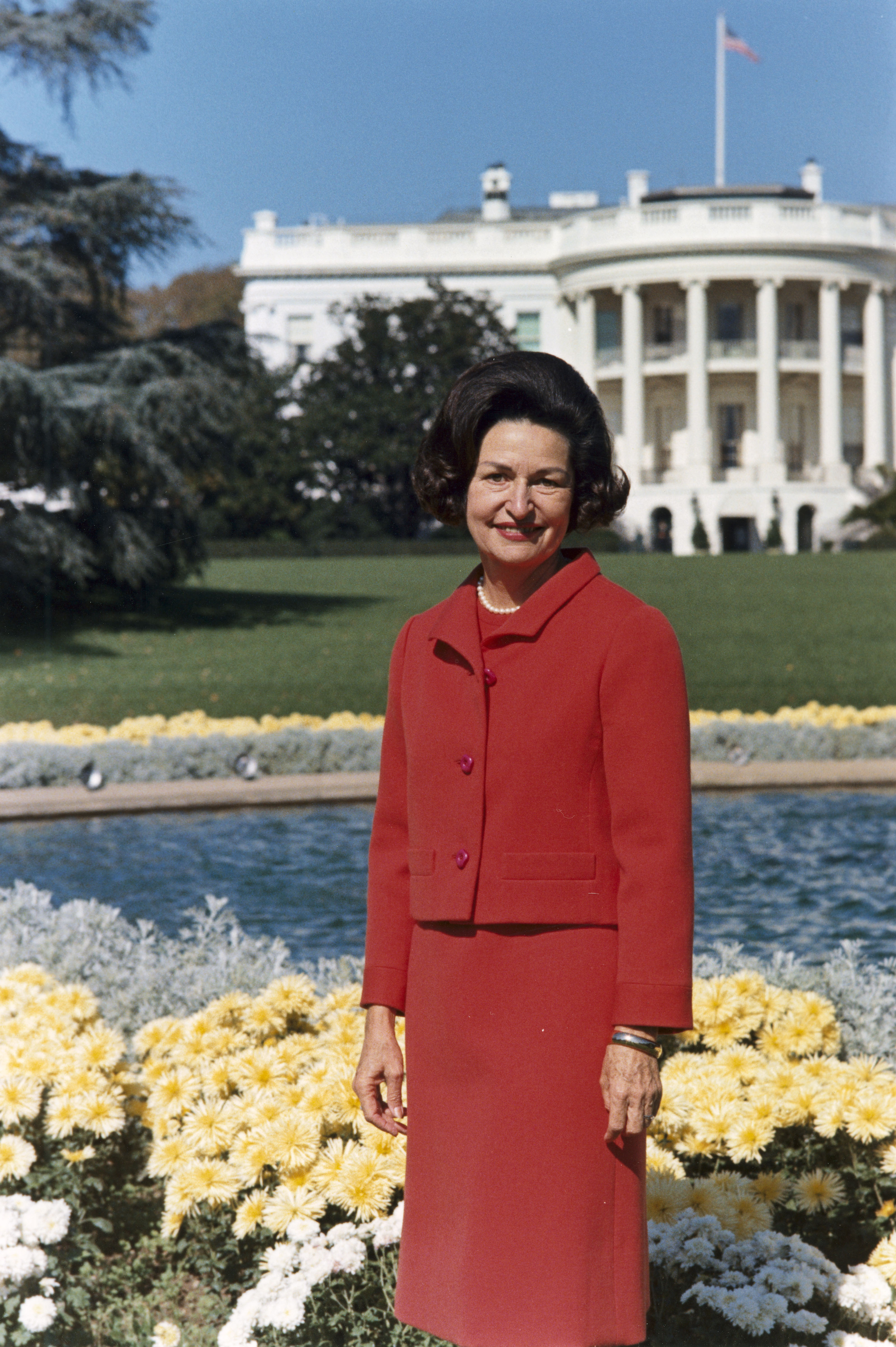
October 22, 1965: Lady Bird Johnson, wife of the U.S. president, succeeds in fight for Highway Beautification Act

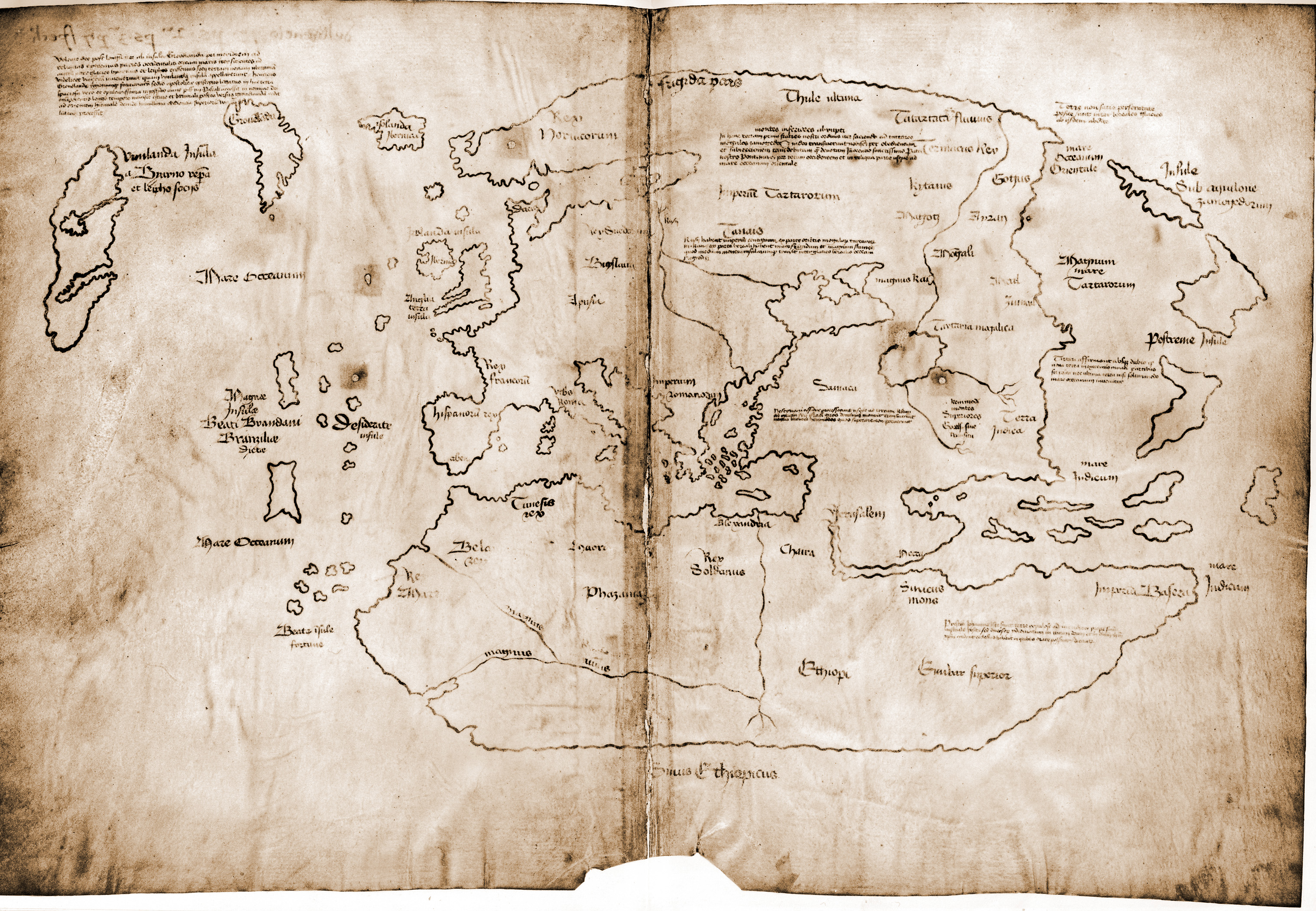
October 12, 1965: Vinland Map first displayed to the public

The following events occurred in October 1965:

== October 1, 1965 (Friday) ==
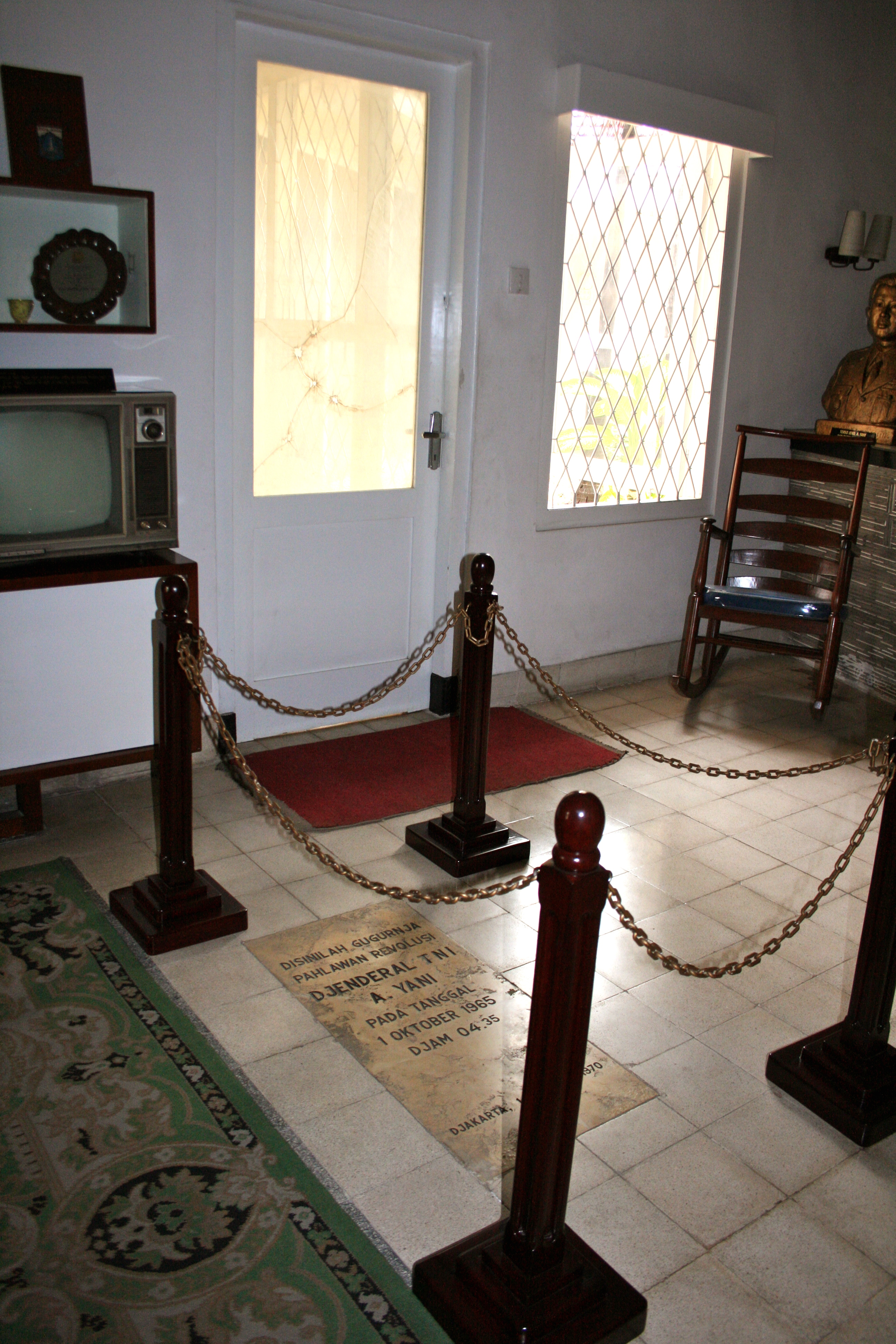
The spot where Ahmad Yani was shot and killed, during an attempted coup in Indonesia

- Members of the 30 September Movement assassinated six Indonesian Army generals in an abortive coup d'état. Other victims included the 5-year-old daughter of General Abdul Harris Nasution, shot by mistake. The movement also kidnapped First Lieutenant Pierre Tendean, mistaking him for General Nasution. At 7:00 a.m., Radio Republik Indonesia broadcast a message from Lieutenant-Colonel Untung Syamsuri, commander of Cakrabirawa, the Presidential guard, stating that the 30 September Movement, an internal army organization, had taken control of strategic locations in Jakarta, with the help of other military units, in order to forestall a coup attempt by a 'General's Council' aided by the Central Intelligence Agency, intent on removing President Sukarno on 5 October, "Army Day". Sukarno took up residence in the Bogor Palace, while Omar Dhani and D.N. Aidit, implicated in the coup, fled the country. Led by Suharto, commander of the Army's Strategic Reserve, the army regained control of all the installations previously held by forces of the 30 September Movement.
- Assassinated by the September 30 movement:
  - Major General M. T. Haryono, 41, Third Deputy Indonesian Army Commander
  - Brigadier General D. I. Pandjaitan, 40, Indonesian Army
  - Major General Siswondo Parman, 47, Indonesian Army, shot
  - Major General R. Soeprapto, 45, Second Deputy Indonesian Army Commander
  - Brigadier General Sutoyo Siswomiharjo, 43, Chief Military Prosecutor
  - Lieutenant General Ahmad Yani, 43, Minister of the Army of Indonesia
- The first telephone conversation between two undersea habitats took place when the aquanauts of the American SEALAB II spoke for 16 minutes with the French oceanauts living in the bathyscaph commanded by Jacques Cousteau. SEALAB II was 205 feet (62 m) beneath the Pacific Ocean off the coast of La Jolla, California, while Cousteau and his crew were 330 feet (100 m) below the harbor of Monte Carlo, Monaco. Oceanographer Rick Gregg, who could speak French, did most of the talking for the Americans, while French team leader André Laban spoke English. According to the UPI account, "The aquanauts and oceanauts had some difficulty understanding one another because the concentration of helium in the atmosphere they breathe made their voices sound like Donald Duck, according to one observer."
- Died: Gareth Hughes, 71, Welsh stage and silent film actor, died of complications of the occupational lung disease byssinosis

== October 2, 1965 (Saturday) ==
- Soviet Communist Party First Secretary Leonid Brezhnev, the de facto leader of the Soviet Union, was given an official Soviet government position when he was returned to the 16 member Presidium of the Supreme Soviet. Brezhnev had been the President of the Presidium, the Soviet Union's head of state, from 1960 to 1964 before replacing Nikita Khrushchev as Party First Secretary. The Presidium also fired Pyotr Lomako from his jobs as Chairman of the State Planning Committee and Deputy Premier, in an apparent move to shift to more productive industrial management.
- The Los Angeles Dodgers won the National League pennant as pitcher Sandy Koufax hurled his 26th win of the season in a 3 to 1 defeat of the Milwaukee Braves on the second to the last day of the season. Going into the 161st game of the 162 game NL season, the Dodgers had a 95–65 and the San Francisco Giants were two games behind at 93–67. While the Giants beat the Cincinnati Reds, 3–2, the Dodgers win left the Giants two games out of first place with only one game left to play.
- Monsignor Harold Robert Perry became the first African-American Roman Catholic bishop of the 20th Century, as Pope Paul VI named him one of the two auxiliary bishops of the Archdiocese of New Orleans. From 1875 to 1900, the Bishop of Portland, Maine, had been James Augustine Healy, a mixed-race priest who was a Negro under the laws of his home state of Georgia.
- The Indonesian Army regained control of Halim Air Force Base after a short battle, effectively ending the 30 September Movement within two days.
- Died:
  - Nicky Arnstein, 86, American gambler and confidence trickster, second husband of Fanny Brice
  - Oskar R. Lange, 61, Polish economist and diplomat

== October 3, 1965 (Sunday) ==
- U.S. President Lyndon B. Johnson signed the Immigration and Nationality Act of 1965 which ended quotas based on national origin. Johnson chose to hold the signing on Liberty Island in New York Harbor, next to the Statue of Liberty. As one historian would observe fifty years later, "the law changed the face of America. The major source countries of immigration radically shifted from Europe to Latin America and Asia. The number of immigrants tripled by 1978. It made the country the highly diverse, multinational, multiethnic, multicultural American nation of immigrants that it is today." Johnson said in a speech, "from this day forth those wishing to immigrate to America shall be admitted on the basis of their skills and their close relationship to those already here. This is a simple test, and it is a fair test. Those who can contribute most to this country--to its growth, to its strength, to its spirit--will be the first that are admitted to this land. The fairness of this standard is so self-evident that we may well wonder that it has not always been applied. Yet the fact is that for over four decades the immigration policy of the United States has been twisted and has been distorted by the harsh injustice of the national origins quota system.... Today, with my signature, this system is abolished. We can now believe that it will never again shadow the gate to the American Nation with the twin barriers of prejudice and privilege."
- Fidel Castro formed the First Secretary of the Communist Party of Cuba, the highest office within the Communist Party of Cuba. Castro would hold the position as First Secretary until he retired from the party in 2011.
- On the same day, Fidel Castro announced that Che Guevara had resigned his government position on April 1 and had left Cuba to fight for the revolutionary cause abroad.
- Born: Jan-Ove Waldner, Swedish table tennis player and world single champion in 1989, 1997, and 2000; in Stockholm
- Died: Zachary Scott, 51, American film and stage actor, died of a brain tumor

== October 4, 1965 (Monday) ==
- The new University of Warwick held its first classes, with 430 students on a campus in Canterbury. Warwick was one of seven new "plate glass universities" created as part of the British campaign to expand the availability of university education to students in the United Kingdom. Fifty years later, Warwick would have almost 27,000 students.
- The United States began bombing Cambodia, despite that nation's neutrality in the Vietnam War, to attack Viet Cong guerrillas who crossed the border from South Vietnam. Records released in 2000 would show that between October 4, 1965, and August 15, 1973, there would be 2,756,941 tons of bombs dropped in 230,516 separate missions.
- The new University of California, Santa Cruz held its first classes, with 665 students, of whom 525 were freshmen in the buildings of Cowell College, the first of ten "residential colleges" that would be the feature of UCSC. Fifty years later, UC Santa Cruz would have almost 18,000 students.
- Eighty-seven people were killed and ten seriously injured when the last three coaches of a South African Railways commuter train derailed near Durban, South Africa. Most of the victims were black; one white railway employee who ran to the scene was beaten to death by angry survivors.
- Pope Paul VI made the first visit ever by the Roman Catholic Pontiff to the United States, appearing for a Mass before 90,000 people at New York's Yankee Stadium and making a speech at the United Nations, as well as meeting with U.S. President Johnson.
- Born: Micky Ward (George Michael Ward Jr.), American light heavyweight boxing champion who competed from 1985 to 2003; in Lowell, Massachusetts

== October 5, 1965 (Tuesday) ==
- The American satellite "Orbital Vehicle 1" was launched westward into orbit from Vandenberg Air Force Base in California, becoming the first human-made object in space to orbit the Earth from east to west, counter to the rotation of the planet. Since the launch of Sputnik in 1957, all Soviet and American satellites had been sent on a west–east trajectory or, in the case of those sent from Vandenberg into polar orbit, fired southward.
- Born:
  - Mario Lemieux, Canadian ice hockey star and Hockey Hall of Fame inductee who played for, and later became the owner of the NHL Pittsburgh Penguins; in Montreal
  - Patrick Roy, Canadian ice hockey star and Hockey Hall of Fame inductee who played goaltender for the NHL Montreal Canadiens and the Colorado Avalanche; in Quebec City

== October 6, 1965 (Wednesday) ==
- Ian Brady and Myra Hindley murdered their fifth and last young victim, luring Edward Evans, a 17-year-old apprentice electrician. After Hindley drove Brady to the Manchester Central Railway station, they selected Evans as a victim and lured him to a house at 16 Wardle Brook Avenue on the Hattersley housing estate in Cheshire. Brady took a hatchet and hacked him to death. Hindley's brother-in-law, who witnessed the murder, called the Cheshire Constabulary early the next day, and Brady was arrested. Hindley would be arrested five days later.
- The Football Association, England's premier soccer organization, inaugurated closed-circuit television broadcasting of games, placing outdoor screens in Coventry so that fans of the Coventry City F.C. Sky Blues could pay to watch their team play 130 miles (210 km) away in Wales against the Cardiff City F.C. Bluebirds. Coventry won the match, 2–1. Over 10,000 people paid to watch at Coventry, "only a couple of thousand less than the actual gate".
- Peter Watkins's The War Game, a British television drama-documentary depicting the aftermath of a nuclear attack on the UK, was pulled from its planned transmission as BBC1's The Wednesday Play for political reasons. It would go on to win the 1966 Academy Award for Best Documentary Feature.
- The United Kingdom and the Netherlands reached a boundary agreement delineating the undersea border between the two nations' control of the continental shelf of the North Sea.
- The Chicago suburb of Bolingbrook, Illinois, was incorporated with roughly 7,000 residents. As of 2010, its population would be 73,366.
- Born: Steve Scalise, current House Minority Whip and U.S. representative of Louisiana's 1st congressional district; in New Orleans

== October 7, 1965 (Thursday) ==
- Retired U.S. Army Lieutenant General Leslie R. Groves, who had overseen the Manhattan Project, revealed to reporters that President Franklin Roosevelt had discussed the possibility of dropping the first atomic bomb on Germany. The occasion was a White House meeting in December 1944, after the December 15 German counterattack against the Allies. "The President said he was concerned that the Battle of the Bulge might upset the war in Europe," Groves said, "and remarked that maybe this would force us to use the bomb against Germany.... I told him that it would be very difficult to change our plans and gave my reasons," which included that the bomb would not be ready until August 1945; that if the bomb's atomic reaction failed, the Germans would be able to figure out the components and structure from the debris; that German buildings were more solidly constructed than those in Japan; and that there were no B-29 bombers in the European theater of operations. Groves said that he spoke out because of "irresponsible criticism that the United States hesitated to drop the bomb on an enemy which happened to be white-skinned."
- The Soviet Lunik 7 lunar probe landed on the Moon on target, but with such force that it was destroyed. The Soviet space agency had no comment, but the director of Britain's Jodrell Bank Observatory, Sir Bernard Lovell, said that all radio signals from the Moon ceased at 2208 UTC, and that he speculated that the craft's retrorockets failed to fire completely. The TASS news agency said the next day that the craft "reached the surface of the Moon at 1:08.24 [Moscow time October 8] in the area of the Ocean of Storms west of Kepler crater... some operations, however, were not carried out in accordance with the program and need additional development." Lovell responded that the probe should not be regarded as a failure and commented that, "The Russians have obtained extremely valuable data from this. For the first time they have been able to slow down a capsule prior to landing on the Moon."
- Super Typhoon Carmen sank seven Japanese fishing boats off Guam, and 209 people were killed.

== October 8, 1965 (Friday) ==
- Prime Minister Ian Smith of Rhodesia, British Prime Minister Harold Wilson, and Arthur Bottomley of the Commonwealth of Nations broke off negotiations in London on a course of action for Britain's last major colony in Africa to become independent, with major disagreement about the issue of majority rule. Smith's position, as described by Chicago reporter Arthur Veysey, was that "the 225,000 white Rhodesians say one-man, one-vote would doom them. They say such an election would be decided on racial lines and the four million Africans would swamp the whites who have been running things, in Britain's name, for 42 years."
- The U.S. House of Representatives voted 245–138 to pass the Highway Beautification Act, legislation requested by Lady Bird Johnson, the President's wife, and largely written under her direction. The Senate had passed the bill on September 16. President Johnson would sign the bill, which restricted outdoor advertising, particularly billboards, on October 22.
- U.S. President Johnson entered the Bethesda Naval Hospital in Bethesda, Maryland and was expected to remain hospitalized for two weeks for gall bladder surgery. During his 14-day stay in Bethesda, the President conducted White House official business and press conferences from his hospital bed.
- The International Olympic Committee admitted East Germany and West Germany as separate members, ending the prior practice after World War II of having the athletes of the two opposing nations compete together as one Germany team.
- The 20th Helicopter Squadron became the first U.S. Air Force cargo helicopter unit to deploy to South Vietnam, operating CH-3C helicopters. It supported Air Force Special Operations "Pony Express" covert operations, primarily in Laos.
- The U.S. Army's 173rd Airborne Brigade Combat Team launched the first major American attack on the "Iron Triangle" in South Vietnam, a concentration of Viet Cong guerrillas in an area only 12 miles (19 km) from Saigon.
- Following the failed 30 September Movement coup attempt, the Indonesian Army instigated the arrest and execution of communists which would last until March.
- Prime Minister Harold Wilson officially opened the 619-foot (189 m) high Post Office Tower, at the time the tallest building in London.

== October 9, 1965 (Saturday) ==
- The first peripheral nerve stimulation (PNS) surgery to relieve chronic pain was performed on a person. Dr. Patrick D. Wall and Dr. William H. Sweet implanted a pair of silastic split-ring platinum electrodes around the ulnar and medium nerves in a patient identified as a 26-year-old woman with clinical presentation consistent with a complex regional pain syndrome.
- Construction began for the yet-unnamed city that would become the new capital of British Honduras, with the dedication of a Maya Indian pillar by Anthony Greenwood, the British Colonial Secretary. Built at the site of the colonial logging centre of Roaring Creek, the new city, completed in 1970, is now named Belmopan.
- At a nursing home in Seriate, Italy, eight elderly women died and another seven were seriously injured after all 15 had been given seemingly routine injections of a "heart tonic" as part of their regular treatment. The deaths all happened within two hours after they were given the shots.
- Citizens in Cibolo, Texas, voted to become an independent city.
- Born: Dionicio Cerón, Mexican marathon runner and winner of the London Marathon in 1994, 1995, and 1996; in Toluca

== October 10, 1965 (Sunday) ==
- Voters in East Germany were allowed for the first time to choose among multiple candidates, as a new system was implemented where "for the first time, more candidates than posts are listed", although few wished to exercise that option. People voting had the choice of folding a printed list of local candidates and depositing it into a ballot box, or asking to step into a voting booth for the opportunity to strike out the names of any candidates whom they did not like. The official National Front nominees were listed at the top of the ballot, and the names of non-Front alternates followed (more than 45,000 all across the country), and an alternate could only be elected if more than 50 percent of the voters struck out the name of a National Front member. All 204,407 of the Front nominees were elected, and few voters chose to be seen using a booth.
- After the 24-day New York City newspaper strike was settled the night before, the New York Daily News and the New York Journal-American (as well as the neighboring Long Island Press) published their first editions since September 16, while The New York Times and the New York World-Telegram resumed the next day. During the first days of October, the New York Herald-Tribune, which had resigned from the Publishers Association in late September, had been the only daily newspaper published in the city.
- Indonesia's President Sukarno appointed General Suharto to form the Indonesian Army's new secret police force, "Operational Command for the Restoration of Security and Order", KOPKAMTIB, an acronym for Komando Operasi Pemulihan Keamanan dan Ketertiban. With the power to suppress political opposition, Suharto would use his position to gradually dismantle Sukarno's regime and to install the "New Order" that he would use as president.
- Drat! The Cat!, one of the least successful Broadway musicals of the decade, opened at the Martin Beck Theatre. With music by Milton Schafer and lyrics by Ira Levin, the production featured stars Lesley Ann Warren, Elliott Gould, Charles Durning, Jane Connell, and Beth Howland, but closed after only eight performances.
- The first group of Cuban refugees to depart the country since Fidel Castro had announced the right to leave departed from the port of Camarioca to travel to the America. The 16 people arrived at Key West the next day on the cabin cruiser MMM, a boat piloted by a crew of four Florida-based Cuban exiles.
- In elections for the 450-member Meclis, the Parliament of Turkey, the Justice Party (Adalet Partisi) led by Süleyman Demirel gained majority control, winning 82 additional seats for 240 overall.
- Ronald Hillery, a 15-year-old, was killed in a climbing accident in Lodge Canyon at Zion National Park in the U.S. state of Utah.
- Born:
  - Toshi (Toshimitsu Deyama), Japanese singer and songwriter who is the lead vocalist and a co-founder of the rock band X Japan; in Tateyama, Chiba Prefecture
  - Chris Penn, American actor (d. 2006); in Los Angeles, California
- Died:
  - H. K. Andrews, 61, English composer and organist for Oxford University, died while performing at the dedication of a new organ at Trinity College.
  - George Tucker, 37, American jazz musician, died the day after suffering a fatal cerebral hemorrhage while performing in a concert.
  - Katsuo Okazaki, 68, former Japanese Foreign Minister and the Japanese Consul-General in Nanjing during the Nanking Massacre in 1937.

== October 11, 1965 (Monday) ==
- In a paper presented at the American Institute of Aeronautics and Astronautics' fourth human spaceflight meeting in St. Louis, AAP Director William B. Taylor described the focus and importance of the AAP. In contrast to the Apollo program, with its clear objective of landing on the Moon, AAP's objectives were much less obvious. Under AAP, Taylor said, NASA planned to exploit the capabilities being developed for Apollo as a technological bridge to more extensive human spaceflight missions of the 1970s and 1980s. Internal studies within NASA had identified the practical limits of the capabilities of Saturn/Apollo systems for extended space missions without fundamental modification of spacecraft and launch vehicles: (1) Earth-centered orbital missions of up to 45 days and at inclinations of 0 to 90 degrees and altitudes of from 185 kilometres (115 mi) up to synchronous orbits (orbital resupply could extend the duration of such missions to three months or more); (2) lunar orbital missions of up to 28 days (including lunar polar orbits) at altitudes as low as 45 kilometres (28 mi) to 55 kilometres (34 mi); and (3) lunar surface missions of up to 14 days at any point on the lunar surface. Through these space activities, stated Taylor, AAP would lay the foundation for later, major ventures in space and thus would contribute significantly to the national goal of preeminence in space.
- King Olav V appointed Per Borten, a farmer in Sør-Trøndelag County in central Norway and leader of the Farmer's Party that finished in fourth place in parliamentary elections, as the new Prime Minister of Norway. Borten, "the man nobody expected to get the job", conceded that he was selected as the new premier because members of the two largest parties of the anti-Socialist coalition, the Conservatives and the Liberals, did not trust each other and had considered him to be neutral. Borten would serve until March 4, 1971.
- The University of Kent at Canterbury, the second of two new British universities, held its first classes with 560 students arriving at its campus in Canterbury. A reporter would note that "the unwieldy title marks the pride of its contributing city and county"; within 50 years, UKC would have nearly 20,000 students.
- The U.S. Air Force renamed the Military Air Transport Service (MATS) to its current name of the Military Airlift Command (MAC).
- The Indianapolis Times, unable to compete against its rivals, the Star and the News, published its last issue.
- Born:
  - Ronit Roy, award-winning Indian film and television actor known for the TV soap opera Kyunki Saas Bhi Kabhi Bahu Thi and the film Udaan; in Nagpur, Maharashtra state
  - Juan Ignacio Cirac Sasturain, Spanish quantum physicist; in Manresa, Catalonia
- Died:
  - Dorothea Lange, 70, American photojournalist most famous for taking the well-known "Migrant Mother" photograph
  - Walther Stampfli, 80, President of the Swiss Confederation in 1944 during World War II
  - Frank M. Dixon, 73, reformist governor of Alabama from 1939 to 1943
  - Hans Nielsen, 53, German film actor

== October 12, 1965 (Tuesday) ==
- The Vinland Map, a map claiming to be created by 15th-century Vikings which would indicate that the Vikings had visited North America centuries before the explorations of Christopher Columbus, was placed on public display at the Beinecke Rare Book and Manuscript Library at Yale University on the occasion of Columbus Day. It was claimed that the map had been re-discovered in 1957, and was donated to Yale by alumnus Paul Mellon. While considered a thrilling find at the time - "the most exciting cartographic discovery of the century" - later analysis showed that the map was produced after the 1920s and was a forgery.
- The U.N. General Assembly voted, 107 to 2, to call on the United Kingdom to "use force, if necessary" to prevent Rhodesia from making a threatened unilateral declaration of independence as a white minority ruled nation. South Africa, which was ruled by its white minority, and Portugal, which still had colonies in Africa, were the only nations to vote against the resolution.
- Born: Hirokazu Yasuhara, Japanese video game designer, known mainly for designing the gameplay and stages of the initial Sonic the Hedgehog video games for the Sega Genesis in the 1990s

== October 13, 1965 (Wednesday) ==
- Congo's President Joseph Kasavubu fired Prime Minister Moise Tshombe and formed a provisional government, with Évariste Kimba as the acting premier. Parliament, however, would not approve Kimba's government and on November 24, President Kasavubu and his government would be overthrown. Tshombe, who had led the secession of Katanga province from the Congo, would go into exile and never return, while Kimba would be executed for treason less than eight months later.
- Born: Aleksandra Konieczna, Polish film and stage actress; in Prudnik
- Died: Paul Hermann Müller, 66, Swiss chemist and 1948 recipient of the Nobel Prize in Physiology or Medicine for his discovery of the properties of the insecticide DDT.

== October 14, 1965 (Thursday) ==
- Test pilots Alvin S. White and USAF Colonel Joseph F. Cotton became the first people to fly an airplane faster than Mach 3 (2,317 mph or 3,729 km/h), pushing an XB-70 Valkyrie jet to Mach 3.02 and continuing at that speed for two minutes at an altitude of 70,000 feet (21,000 m). After slowing down to allow chase planes to catch up with them, White and Cotton found that about 2 feet (0.61 m) of the leading edge of the left wing had sheared off from the stress of the supersonic flight. The two would fly the supersonic bomber at Mach 3 for 30 minutes on May 19, 1966.
- Led by pitcher Sandy Koufax, the Los Angeles Dodgers defeated the Minnesota Twins, 2–0, in Game Seven of the best-4-of-7 1965 World Series to win the Major League Baseball championship. In the fifth inning, 37-year-old second baseman Jim Gilliam caught a left field hit by the Twins' Zoilo Versalles that might have driven in two runs. The Dodgers' two were scored by a home run from Lou Johnson in the fourth inning. The game ended when, with one man on base, Koufax struck out Minnesota's Bob Allison, who had hit 23 home runs that year.
- The Polaris A-1 submarine-launched ballistic nuclear missile (SLBM) was taken out of service by the U.S. Navy after a little more than five years of deployment on submarines worldwide, and replaced in all ballistic subs with the Polaris A-2.
- Born: Steve Coogan, British comedian and actor known for his creation of the Alan Partridge character for television, winner of five British Academy Television Awards; in Middleton, Lancashire
- Died:
  - Randall Jarrell, 51, American poet, was killed when he was struck by a car.
  - William Wilson, 90, British physicist

== October 15, 1965 (Friday) ==
- An order by the Federal Communications Commission (FCC) took effect, changing the nature and popularity of FM radio station broadcasting in the United States. Prior to the adoption of the rule, which was first proposed on July 1, 1964, AM radio stations that had an FM radio transmitter would use the FM band as an adjunct to simulcast the AM radio programs. "Obviously," the commission would write in 1965, "it is a waste of valuable spectrum space to use two frequencies to bring the same material to the same location. This has been permitted in the past because it provided an easy and inexpensive start for FM broadcast." Under the new rule, no FM station serving any city of 100,000 or more people was allowed no use more than half of its air time for the rebroadcasting of AM station programming." A radio historian, Denny Sanders, would later note that because of the FCC rule, AM station owners used their less popular FM stations for alternative formats (such as album-oriented rock) aimed at "baby boomers", stereo recordings could be broadcast on FM and not on AM and the sound quality on FM was better.
- The Vatican ecumenical council of bishops voted, 1,763 to 250, to accept a declaration stating that the Jewish race could not be blamed for the crucifixion of Jesus Christ. "On the Church's Attitude Toward Non-Christians" was approved for promulgation by Pope Paul VI as a decree that would be binding upon all members of the Roman Catholic Church worldwide. The document also spoke out against any attempts to describe Jewish people as "rejected" or "accursed" by God. An AP report commented that "Probably no document had aroused so much controversy at the 4-year-old council. Never before has any general council in 20 centuries of Catholicism taken such positive stands on the Jewish and other non-Christian religions.
- Guitarist Jimi Hendrix signed a three-year recording contract with Ed Chalpin, receiving $1 and 1% royalty on records with Curtis Knight. The agreement would later cause continuous litigation problems for Hendrix with other record labels.
- Mikhail Sholokhov of the Soviet Union, best known as the author of the novel Tikhy Don (published in English as And Quiet Flows the Don) was announced as the recipient of the 1965 Nobel Prize for Literature.
- Died: Abraham Fraenkel, 74, German-born Israeli mathematician best-known for the Zermelo–Fraenkel set theory

== October 16, 1965 (Saturday) ==
- On the penultimate day of the New York World's Fair, a time capsule was lowered 50 feet (15 m) into the ground, containing 117,000 pages of microfilmed records from 1940 to 1965, as well as 45 other objects. The capsule, buried 10 feet (3.0 m) away from another capsule placed for the 1939 New York World's Fair, is not scheduled to be opened until the year 6939 AD. Among the objects included were "credit cards, a bikini, contact lenses, birth control pills, tranquilizers, a plastic heart valve, a pack of filter cigarettes, an electric toothbrush, and a heat shield from Apollo 7", as well as photographs of Andrew Wyeth paintings, a Henry Moore sculpture, microfilms of a book by Ernest Hemingway, poetry by Dylan Thomas and Robert Frost, a tape of a Danny Kaye television show, records by the Beatles, Joan Baez, and Thelonious Monk, and photographs of celebrities from the 1940s, 1950s, and 1960s.
- Police found a girl's body on Saddleworth Moor near Oldham in Lancashire, which was quickly identified as that of 10-year-old Lesley Ann Downey, who had disappeared on December 26, from a fairground in the Ancoats area of Manchester. Ian Brady, who had been arrested a week earlier for murdering a 17-year-old boy, was charged along with his girlfriend Myra Hindley for Lesley's murder.
- At Longshoreman's Hall in San Francisco, "A Tribute to Dr. Strange", described as "the first psychedelic rock concert", was performed, with the groups Jefferson Airplane, The Marbles, and The Great Society performing.
- Anti-war protests drew 100,000 demonstrators in 40 cities in the U.S. and around the world.
- Died: Enrico Piaggio, 60, Italian industrialist who created the Vespa scooter

== October 17, 1965 (Sunday) ==
- An Avianca Airlines DC-3 plane with 12 passengers and a crew of three was arriving at Bucaramanga, Colombia, in a flight from Bogotá. As it was approaching, a 21-year-old pilot, who had been awarded his license only two months earlier, was taking off from the same airport in a Piper Super Cub and collided with the DC-3. Both airplanes came down in the residential neighborhoods of Las Terrazas and El Jardin, and the 16 people on both planes were killed.
- The New York World's Fair at Flushing Meadows, New York, observed its last day. Rides remained open until 2:00 in the morning on Monday. During its 1964 and 1965 runs, it attracted more than 50,000,000 admissions. At the same time, the fair had a deficit of over $35,000,000. As a result of its financial losses, some of the projected site park improvements had failed to materialize.
- The first successful American attack on a North Vietnamese surface-to-air missile (SAM) site was accomplished when four A-4 Skyhawk attack bombers struck a site near the Kép airfield northeast of Hanoi.
- The musical On a Clear Day You Can See Forever, with music by Burton Lane and lyrics by Alan Jay Lerner, opened on Broadway at the Mark Hellinger Theatre for the first of 280 performances.
- Seven coal miners at Clinchfield Coal Company's Mars No. 2 near Buckhannon, West Virginia, mine were killed in a fire.
- Born: Aravinda de Silva, Sri Lankan cricketer batsman; in Colombo, Ceylon (now Sri Lanka)
- Died:
  - Harold Kite, 43, American race car driver on the NASCAR circuit, was killed in a five-car pileup on the first lap of the National 400 race at the Charlotte Motor Speedway in Concord, North Carolina.
  - Bart King, 91, American cricket bowler and batsman who starred for the touring Gentlemen of Philadelphia between 1893 and 1912.

== October 18, 1965 (Monday) ==
- David J. Miller of Syracuse, New York, a 22-year-old man protesting the Vietnam War, became the first person to be arrested under the new federal law that made defacement of a selective service information card punishable as a crime. Miller, who described himself as "a Catholic pacifist", was photographed burning his draft card on October 15 during an anti-war rally in New York City by the Catholic Worker Movement. Miller was located by the FBI in Hooksett, New Hampshire, asked to produce his draft card, and charged when he failed to produce it.
- With secret approval given by President Johnson on September 21, American troops took the Vietnam War into neighboring Laos as part of Operation Shining Brass, losing six men.
- Born:
  - Zakir Naik, Sunni Muslim televangelist in India and founder of Peace TV; in Mumbai
  - Curtis Stigers, American jazz vocalist and saxophonist; in Boise, Idaho

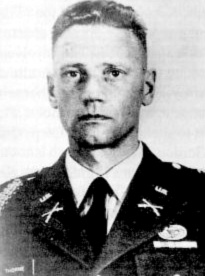
Thorne

- Died:
  - Lauri Törni (Larry Thorne), 46, Finnish-born soldier who fought as a Finnish Army officer (1938–1944), as a German Waffen-SS captain (1941, 1945), and as a United States Army Major (1954–1965), was killed in a helicopter crash during the Vietnam War. His body would not be discovered until 1999.
  - Henry Travers, 91, English-born character actor on film and stage who specialized in portraying "slightly bumbling but friendly and lovable old men", most notably as Clarence Odbody in It's a Wonderful Life, and Mr. Ballard in Mrs. Miniver.

== October 19, 1965 (Tuesday) ==
- The Siege of Plei Me began when 6,000 Viet Cong and 33rd North Vietnamese Army Regiment troops attacked the Plei Me fort near Pleiku in South Vietnam, in "one of the largest Communist offensives of the Vietnam War. The 400 South Vietnamese Rangers and twelve U.S. Army Special Forces officers were supplemented by 200 additional Rangers who were brought in by helicopter the next day, and the group of 662 men held out until the U.S. 1st Cavalry Division were able to lift the siege on October 27.
- Die Ermittlung (The Investigation), a play by Peter Weiss about the Frankfurt Auschwitz trials, premiered simultaneously in 14 cities in both West Germany and East Germany, as well as in London. Subtitled "Oratorio in 11 Cantos", Weiss's drama was seen that evening in East Berlin and West Berlin, as well as the West German cities of Cologne, Essen, and Munich, and the East German cities of Cottbus, Dresden, Gera, Leuna, London, Meiningen, Neustrelitz, Potsdam, and Weimar.
- The House Un-American Activities Committee (HUAC) opened public hearings in the first Congressional investigation of the American Ku Klux Klan white supremacist organizations. Over the next four months, it would subpoena almost 200 members of various Klan organizations, starting with Robert Shelton, the Imperial Wizard of the United Klans of America.
- Léopold Biha, who had been appointed as the new Prime Minister of Burundi less than three weeks earlier, was seriously wounded in an assassination attempt during a coup attempt by Hutu members of the Burundi military against the Tutsi government. Biha would be hospitalized in Europe and would not be able to return to his duties until April.

== October 20, 1965 (Wednesday) ==
- President Johnson signed the Motor Vehicle Air Pollution Control Act into law, permitting the first federal standards for vehicle exhaust. Under the rules, which were effective starting with the 1968 model year cars and trucks, carbon monoxide had to be reduced by more than half of the 1963 levels in the Clean Air Act of 1963 and hydrocarbons by nearly three-fourths. The House of Representatives had passed the bill on September 24 by a margin of 294 to 4, with the only opposition coming from future U.S. Senator Bob Dole of Kansas, Paul Findley of Illinois, and Graham Purcell and William R. Poage of Texas. Johnson signed the Solid Waste Disposal Act of 1965 into law on the same day, with the objective of "conservation of natural resources by reducing the amount of waste and unsalvageable materials" in manufacturing, packaging and marketing of consumer products, and to eliminate methods of trash disposal that resulted in scenic blights, public health hazards and accident hazards.
- Ludwig Erhard was re-elected Chancellor of Germany, by a vote of 272 to 200 in the Bundestag, by the 245 members of his own Christian Democratic Union party and another 27 votes from the Free Democrats, who received four of the 23 cabinet posts in the coalition government. The other candidate was future Chancellor Willy Brandt, leader of the Social Democrats. He had first been elected in 1963.
- Manned Spacecraft Center (MSC) and Marshall Space Flight Center (MSFC) program officials and engineers held their first coordination meeting on the S-IVB Orbital Workshop and related Apollo Applications Program experiment activities. Among the most significant results of this meeting was a request by Houston for inclusion of an artificial gravity experiment as part of the S-IVB command and service module concept of the Workshop.
- Born:
  - Mikhail Shtalenkov, Russian ice hockey goaltender and Olympic gold medalist; in Moscow
  - Stefano Pioli, Italian former association football player and current coach; in Parma

== October 21, 1965 (Thursday) ==
- The U.S. Congress completed passage of the appropriations bills to fund the Great Society programs passed during the Johnson Administration, with a final bill to allocate $4,741,644,602 to cover the initial costs of Medicare, highway beautification, minting new coins without silver, expanding aid to education, and funding a variety of public welfare programs. The new amount raised the final 1965 total for money appropriated for the Great Society to the largest peacetime expenditure in American history up to that time, totaling $119.3 billion.
- The Nobel Prize winners for 1965 were announced at Stockholm, with the Nobel Prize in Chemistry going to Robert Burns Woodward for the synthesis of chlorophyll, quinine, cholesterol, cortisone, reserpine, and strychnine during his career. The Nobel Prize in Physics was awarded jointly to Richard P. Feynman, Julian Schwinger, and Shin'ichirō Tomonaga, for their "fundamental work in quantum electrodynamics with deep-ploughing consequences for the physics of elementary particles".
- George Roeder of Monroeville, Ohio, shattered the record for fastest speed on a motorcycle, traveling 176.824 miles per hour (or 284.57 km/h) at the Bonneville Salt Flats on a shielded Harley-Davidson 250 cc Sprint cycle. He covered the measured mile long course in 20.36 seconds. The previous record had been 156.24 miles per hour (251.44 km/h).
- Dick Tiger of Nigeria reclaimed his title of boxing's World Middleweight Champion from Joey Giardello, who had dethroned him on December 7, 1963. Tiger (real name Richard Ihetu) won in a unanimous decision after the two had gone the full 15 rounds.
- British police found the decomposed body of a boy on Saddleworth Moor. It was later confirmed as that of John Kilbride, killed by the Moors murderers nearly two years earlier.
- Comet Ikeya–Seki approached perihelion, passing 450,000 kilometres (280,000 mi) from the Sun, and was bright enough to be seen in daylight from the Earth.
- The U.S. Senate approved the Canada-United States Automotive Agreement, signed on January 16 by President Johnson and Prime Minister Pearson.
- Died:
  - Marie McDonald, 42, American actress and singer known as "The Body" because of her shapely physique, died of a drug overdose at her home. Her death was ruled as accidental by an inquest.
  - Bill Black, 39, rock and roll pioneer and inductee of the Rock & Roll Hall of Fame, died during surgery for a brain tumor.

== October 22, 1965 (Friday) ==
- President Johnson signed the Highway Beautification Act into law, marking the end of a successful lobbying campaign by his wife, Lady Bird Johnson. An author would later note of Mrs. Johnson, "She had exercised the implicit power of the First Lady to push serious legislation through Congress. At no other time would enactment of billboard regulation even have been possible. In that sense, Mrs. Johnson's success represented a unique achievement in the historical evolution of the institution of First Lady." The U.S. Department of Commerce was authorized to withhold 20% of highway funding for any states that failed to set higher standards to regulate outdoor advertising.
- Cuba's Premier Fidel Castro issued what he referred to as a "clarification" of his September decree allowing free departure from the island nation for any Cubans who wished to leave. Castro said that young men between the ages of 17 and 26 would not be allowed to leave while they were eligible to be drafted into military service, and that professionals like physicians, dentists, nurses, engineering school graduates, and certain technical specialists were required to stay.
- Members of the Organization of African Unity (OAU) voted to demand that the United Kingdom use force to prevent Rhodesia from declaring unilateral independence.
- French authors André Figueras and Jacques Laurent were fined for their comments against France's president, Charles De Gaulle.
- Died:

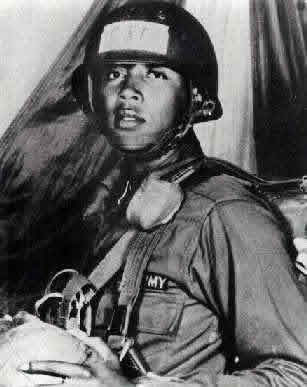
PFC Olive

  - Private First Class Milton Lee Olive III, 18, the first African-American to be awarded the Medal of Honor for service in the Vietnam War. Private Olive dove onto a live hand grenade and shielded four other members of his platoon from the blast. On April 28, 1966, he would be awarded the medal posthumously.
  - Paul Tillich, 79, German-born American theologian

== October 23, 1965 (Saturday) ==
- Dr. William Rashkind announced the success of his new surgical procedure, atrial balloon septostomy on newborn infants born with a cyanotic heart defect caused by transposition of the great arteries, speaking at a meeting of the cardiology section of the American Academy of Pediatrics in Chicago. As one observer would note on the 25th anniversary of the surgery, Rashkind's announcement "permanently altered the course of cardiology and opened the era of therapeutic interventional catheterization."
- The Roman Catholic bishops representing France during the Ecumenical Council in Rome announced that they were reviving, with the consent of Pope Paul VI, the ordination of "a small number of priests to work full time in factories and yards after a suitable period of preparation", reviving the "Worker-Priest" program that had been abandoned in 1954.

== October 24, 1965 (Sunday) ==
- Leading Cuban troops in the Congo, Che Guevara was almost killed when he attempted to engage in battle with mercenary soldiers commanded by Mike Hoare. According to one member of Guevara's camp at Luluaburg Mountain, "Che was shooting standing up and some fellow Cubans, trying to protect him, told him to lay down. He became angry and said 'There is only one Comandante here!'" After Guevara gave the order to retreat, four of the Cuban soldiers did not hear the command and continued to fight, giving the rest of the group time to get away.

== October 25, 1965 (Monday) ==
- The launch of the Gemini 6 crewed space mission, intended to attempt a linkup with an uncrewed orbiting docking target, was postponed after the explosion of the Atlas booster rocket carrying the Gemini Agena target vehicle (GATV). The GATV was launched from Cape Kennedy's complex 14 and the Atlas rocket exploded at 10:06 a.m. local time, six minutes after launch, apparently as it was breaking the bonds of gravity. Gemini 6, with astronauts Wally Schirra and Thomas P. Stafford, had been scheduled to go up at 11:41. Countdown was halted and Schirra and Stafford climbed out of the Gemini 6 vehicle by 11:10 after the destruction of the GATV was confirmed. NASA would launch Gemini 6 on December 15, and with Schirra and Stafford to perform a rendezvous with another crew on the Gemini 7 spacecraft.
- The Soviet Ministry of Defense issued a decree formally directing that the OKB-1 L1 lunar rocket system replace the LK-1 design that had been designed by the rival OKB-52 construction unit. The objective of what would become the Soyuz 7K-L1 was to create a rocket to rival the power of the American Saturn V in order to win the race between the U.S. and the USSR to place the first man on the Moon.
- Burglars in downtown Syracuse, New York used a 20-millimetre (0.79 in) cannon to get into a vault at Brink's Inc., blasting a large hole through steel walls 2 feet (0.61 m) thick. According to police, the thieves used mattresses to muffle the sound of the weapon during the early morning hours, and made off with $400,000 in loot.
- Governor Haydon Burns of Florida confirmed the report broken five days earlier by Orlando Sentinel reporter Emily Bavar, and announced that Walt Disney Productions was the purchaser of 27,443 acres of land (43 square miles or 113 square kilometers) in Orange County, Florida, on which Walt Disney World would be built.
- Born: Maury Travis, American serial killer who was speculated to have murdered up to 20 women between 2000 and 2002; in St. Louis, Missouri (committed suicide by hanging, 2002)
- Died: Hans Knappertsbusch, 77, German symphony conductor

== October 26, 1965 (Tuesday) ==
- Sylvia Likens, aged 16, died in Indianapolis after three months of torture and abuse by Mrs. Gertrude Baniszewski, her children Paula Baniszewski and John Baniszewski, and two of the children's friends, Coy Hubbard and Richard Hobbs.
- The Beatles became "the first pop stars to be invited into Buckingham Palace" as they received their designation of MBE (Members of the Order of the British Empire) at the Great Throne Room. As part of the occasion, a military marching band played the music for "Can't Buy Me Love".
- Born:
  - Ken Rutherford, New Zealand cricketer and former national team captain; in Dunedin
  - Aaron Kwok, Hong Kong singer and actor; in British Hong Kong
  - Sakari Oramo, Finnish conductor and violinist; in Helsinki
  - Kelly Rowan, Canadian television actress; in Ottawa

== October 27, 1965 (Wednesday) ==
- All 36 people on British European Airways Flight 706 were killed when the airliner crashed while attempting to land in London in a thick fog. The Vanguard airliner had originated in Edinburgh at 11:17 p.m. the night before and had made two attempts to land. On its third try, it hit the runway at full power, skidded for a mile, and crashed into a workshop at 1:30 in the morning.
- Brazilian president Humberto de Alencar Castelo Branco, backed by the nation's armed forces, issued "Institutional Act No. 2", a decree suspending all political parties, and giving him power to pass laws and to amend Brazil's constitution without approval from the nation's Congress.
- Süleyman Demirel of the Justice Party formed a new government as Prime Minister of Turkey.
- Died:
  - Ardeshir Darabshaw Shroff, 66, Indian economist, industrialist, and banker who co-authored the Bombay Plan for the economic development of post-independence India, founded the Investment Corporation of India, and served as the Chairman of the Bank of India and the New India Assurance Company Limited.
  - Guy Richardson, 44, British Olympic rower, was killed in the crash of British European Airways Flight 706.
  - Peter La Farge, 34, American folk singer and songwriter, died from a stroke caused by an overdose of Thorazine.

== October 28, 1965 (Thursday) ==
- Pope Paul VI promulgated five important Ecumenical Council documents from the Vatican II conference:
  - Nostra Aetate ("In our Time", subtitled "On the Relations of the Church to Non-Christian Religions")
  - Perfectae Caritatis, "Up-to-date renewal of religious life"
  - Gravissimum Educationis ("On Christian Education")
  - Christus Dominus ("On the Pastoral Office of Bishops")
  - Optatam Totius ("On the Training of Priests")
- The White House announced that NASA would attempt another launch of Gemini 6 while Gemini 7 was in orbit.
- In St. Louis, Missouri, the 630-foot (190 m)-tall inverted catenary steel Gateway Arch was topped out, as Vice President Hubert Humphrey observed from a helicopter, and an opening ceremony, originally scheduled for October 17, was held. A time capsule, containing the signatures of 762,000 students and others, was welded into the keystone before the final piece was set in place. A Catholic priest and a rabbi prayed over the keystone, a 10-short-ton (9.1 t), 8-foot-long (2.4 m) triangular section.
- The Moel-y-Parc transmitting station, the tallest structure in North Wales, began transmissions of BBC 405-line TV in addition to ITV, obtaining its signal from an SHF link on the Great Orme which picked up the signal from Llanddona on Anglesey.
- Viet Cong guerrillas used mortars to destroy 18 American helicopters and two jets, and to damage 27 other aircraft, in an attack on two different air bases in South Vietnam.
- Born: Francisco Domínguez Brito, Attorney General of the Dominican Republic from 2006 to 2010; in Gurabo

== October 29, 1965 (Friday) ==
- As part of the Vela Uniform program, code-named Project Long Shot, an 80-kiloton atomic bomb was detonated at a depth of 2,300 feet (700 m) underground at Amchitka Island, Alaska, within the Alaska Maritime National Wildlife Refuge. "The Long Shot test... was not only fully contained but also left the sea otters and other wildlife unscathed," an author would note later. Two more Alaskan nuclear tests would be made at the same underground site, with the one megaton "Milrow" bomb in 1969, and the five megaton "Cannikin" in 1971. The purpose of the Longshot test was to determine whether an underground nuclear explosion generated wave patterns that were distinguishable from those generated by earthquakes on the Soviet Union's Kamchatka Peninsula, and scientists determined that the nuclear tests provided symmetrical wave patterns that would be readily discernible from natural tremors.
- Mehdi Ben Barka, living in exile after formerly serving as the leader of the National Consultative Assembly of Morocco, was kidnapped and executed after having been sentenced to death in absentia. Ben Barka had been living in Geneva in Switzerland but was lured by an agent of Israel's intelligence service, the Mossad, to travel to Paris for a supposed meeting with film producer Georges Franju to appear in a documentary. Outside the Brasserie Lipp restaurant on Boulevard Saint-Germain, Ben-Barka was arrested by three French security officers, who then took him away in a car. Ben Barka was not seen in public again, and was turned over to Morocco's Minister of the Interior, Mohamed Oufkir, whose agents tortured and killed him the next day.
- Indonesia's crackdown on that nation's Communist Party, the Partai Komunis Indonesia (PKI), expanded as the Minister of Education, Brigadier General Syarif Thayeb, instructed universities to purge their ranks of any academic or administrative staff who were linked to the PKI.
- King Mohammed Zahir Shah dismissed Mohammad Yusuf from his position as Prime Minister of Afghanistan. The following year, the King would appoint him as Ambassador to West Germany.
- Born:
  - Christy Clark, Premier of British Columbia from 2011 to 2017; in Burnaby
  - Andrew Ettingshausen, Australian rugby player; in Sutherland
  - Louis Alexander Waldman, American art historian and professor
- Died:
  - Bill McKechnie, 79, American baseball manager and inductee of the Baseball Hall of Fame, known for being the first to lead two different teams (the 1925 Pittsburgh Pirates and the 1940 Cincinnati Reds) to win the World Series.
  - Frank Wisner, 56, former Director of Plans for the Central Intelligence Agency, shot himself to death at his home in Galena, Maryland.

== October 30, 1965 (Saturday) ==
- British Prime Minister Harold Wilson who had traveled to Rhodesia to negotiate conditions for Rhodesia's independence with Rhodesian Prime Minister Ian Smith, ended his mission with a television speech announcing that the United Kingdom would not use force to prevent Smith's white government from declaring independence, but that the UK would impose sanctions, especially on the shipment of oil. "Whether force should and could have been used has been the subject of intense academic debate," an author would note later, but Wilson's statement would be followed by Rhodesia's secession 12 days later, on November 11.
- An explosion of fireworks killed 47 people and injured more than 200 at a crowded indoor market in Cartagena, Colombia. The fireworks had been in a storage room, awaiting sale in advance of the city holidays set for November 11, and the blast happened at around 9:00 on a Saturday morning, when hundreds of people were shopping.
- The White House announced that circulation of the first 230,000,000 of the new, "nonsilver" American quarters would be put into circulation during the coming week, but emphasized that the new coins "will be added to the circulation of the traditional 90 percent silver quarter", and that "Both the old and new quarters are to circulate together."
- In New York City, 25,000 people marched down Fifth Avenue in support of President Johnson and the Vietnam War. Demonstrations of support took place in other locations in the United States as well. The New York march was sponsored by the New York City Council, the American Legion and the Veterans of Foreign Wars."
- English model Jean Shrimpton wore a controversially short white shift dress to the Victoria Derby at Flemington Racecourse in Melbourne, Australia – a pivotal moment of the introduction of the miniskirt to women's fashion.
- Two U.S. Air Force Skyraider A-1 attack bombers mistakenly struck the South Vietnamese village of De Duc in Bình Định Province, near Bong Son, killing 48 civilians, mostly women and children, and injuring 48 more.
- Near Da Nang, the United States Marines repelled an intense attack by Viet Cong forces, killing 56 guerrillas. A sketch of Marine positions was found on the dead body of a 13-year-old Vietnamese boy who had sold drinks to the Marines the day before.
- Died:
  - Arthur Wrigley, 53, English cricket statistician and commentator for the BBC, died at Stockport, Cheshire after a short illness. His death came days after the publication of his first compilation of statistics and records, the 750-page The Book of Test Cricket.
  - Arthur M. Schlesinger, Sr., 77, American historian

== October 31, 1965 (Sunday) ==
- In Leipzig, East Germany, the "Beat Revolt" (Leipziger Beatdemo) took place after East German government revoked the performing licenses of the 50 amateur bands that played rock music and issued new rules to restrict listening to Western music in public. When Leipzig's most popular band, Butler, was ordered not to play further, two teenagers printed leaflets urging a protest march. The Stasi began interrogating witnesses "thereby advertising the march even more", and on a Sunday afternoon, more than 2,000 people gathered, either to protest or to watch. The crowd was ordered to disperse, even though no banners were displayed, nor noise made, and when they refused, the Stasi arrested 267 people, some of whom were sentenced to forced labor. Despite, or because of the crackdown, an increasing number of young East Germans began listening to Western music and adopting Western styles of dress.
- The Rockingham Speedway was inaugurated in Rockingham, North Carolina, with the running of the first American 500, won by Curtis Turner, who averaged nearly 102 miles per hour (164 km/h) to complete the race in almost six minutes less than five hours.
- Twenty-people were injured in a chain-reaction crash or pile-up of almost 100 cars on the Santa Ana Freeway near Norwalk, California. On the same fog-shrouded morning, another 50 cars were involved in a pile up on the Harbor Freeway in South Los Angeles.
- Born:
  - Paul du Toit, South African painter and sculptor; in Johannesburg (died of cancer, 2014)
  - Denis Irwin, Irish footballer and journalist; in Cork with 56 caps for the Ireland national team
  - Blue Edwards, American basketball player; in Washington D.C.
  - Rob Rackstraw, English voice actor; in Sunderland, County Durham
- Died:
  - Dan Burros, 28, anti-Semitic member of the American Nazi Party and a recruiter for the New York City branch of the United Klans of America, committed suicide after The New York Times broke the news that he had been born to Jewish parents and had been raised as a Jew. Burros, who had received his bar mitzvah as an adolescent and had been a star pupil at a Hebrew School, went to the home of a friend, told him "I ain't got nothing to live for," and shot himself in the chest and in the head.
  - Jan Kowalewski, 73, Polish cryptologist, intelligence officer, engineer, journalist and military commander
  - Rita Johnson, 52, American stage, film and radio actress, died of a cerebral hemorrhage
