= Leipzig Beat Revolt =

The Leipzig Beat Revolt, in German also called Leipziger Beatdemo, Beatkrawalle or Beataufstand, took place on 31 October 1965 in Leipzig-Mitte. The demonstration (Demo for short) was an expression of youth emancipation in the GDR, directed against the state ban on beat music and numerous beat groups. The main reason for the demonstration was the ban imposed ten days earlier on 54 of the 58 registered Leipzig bands, including the popular band Butlers. The demonstration was violently broken up by the Volkspolizei (People's Police) and the Stasi (State Security) immediately after the start. Of the 264 demonstrators arrested, 97 were deployed for up to six weeks on “supervised work” in the Kitzscher and United Schleenhain coal mine. The Leipzig Beat Demo was the largest non-approved demonstration in the GDR after the events of 17 June 1953 and, along with the events of 7 October 1977 on Berlin's Alexanderplatz (468 arrests), remained unique in this form until autumn 1989.

== The situation beforehand ==
Making music in the group and the beat concerts not only meant fun in their free time, but also provided many young people with an outlet against government pressures. Initially, the beat movement was tolerated by the state authorities and even praised as a progressive phenomenon. In particular, attempts were made to influence young people through the youth organization FDJ. As a result, in the early 1960s, FDJ officials and local cultural officials promoted and supported the young bands. This development was particularly evident in the SED Youth Communiqué issued in 1963, which declared young people to be the "landlords of tomorrow” and promised them “trust and responsibility”. The emphasis on one's own responsibility, however, was later decidedly used against Beatmania.

The 1964 Pentecost Germany meeting of the FDJ, from which the radio station DT64 emerged, is generally cited as the high point of the new openness. The youth functionary at the time, Hans Modrow, said later: "Of course, you understood that if you want to win over young people, you also have to accept what moves and inspires young people".

== Political dispute and turning point in state youth and cultural policy ==
The new opening of the FDJ central council, which praised the "guitar sound as a progressive phenomenon of dance music development" in a "point of view of the culture department on the work with the guitar groups", was controversial from the start. In particular, the Bezirk Leipzig SED leadership suggested as early as 9 September 1964, "to take the chapel (meaning the butlers) and the youth groups who regularly attend dance evenings in this chapel into operational processing". A functionary of the "Ideological Commission of the City of Leipzig" gave his assessment "that the variety and the hits do not contribute to a positive upbringing of young people". The most important opponent of the new youth policy was in the Politburo of the SED. While Walter Ulbricht took a holiday, Erich Honecker, then responsible for security issues in the Politburo, in preparation for the XI. Plenary session of the Central Committee of the SED initiated the initiative and let the central committee debate "issues of youth work and the occurrence of hooliganism" alongside other "socialism-foreign, harmful tendencies and views".

A concert by the Rolling Stones in West Berlin's Waldbühne on 15 September 1965, at which riots broke out, was a welcome argument for these determined opponents of the beat movement.

== 31 October and its aftermath ==
Two young people from Markkleeberg near Leipzig, who did not want to accept the ban, then produced leaflets calling for a protest demonstration. The demonstration was supposed to take place on 31 October 1965 at Wilhelm-Leuschner-Platz in the center of Leipzig. Demand was the readmission of the beat bands. Due to the lack of time and the limited technical possibilities, the effectiveness of the leaflet campaign was low. When the authorities became aware of the planned action, they initially took action against the young people with agitation and propaganda. The beat movement was defamed, especially in the local press, and warned against taking part in the demonstration. At the Leipzig secondary and vocational schools, teachers and officials warned the students against participating and threatened non-compliance with expulsion from school and other penalties. While the leaflet campaign attracted comparatively little attention, the state's response had the opposite effect. Many young people only found out about the planned demonstration in this way.

Finally, around 2,000 to 2,500 people, mostly young people, gathered on Wilhelm-Leuschner-Platz in front of the New Town Hall. Among them a core of about 800 "real" Beat supporters and many officials and security forces in civilian clothes. The demonstration was broken up with a massive police presence using rubber truncheons, dogs and a water cannon.

After this event, the GDR introduced the concept of hooliganism (in DDR German: Rowdytum) as a criminal offense and reacted to the 11th plenum of the Central Committee of the SED in December 1965 with a radical change in culture and youth policy.

== Coping in literature ==
In his 1977 novel Es geht seinen Gang Erich Loest integrated the Leipzig Beat Revolt into the biography of his hero Wolfgang Wülff. He only found out about the demonstration from his teacher in Staatsbürgerkunde (civics in DDR German), who repeatedly warned against participation in class, went to Leuschnerplatz out of curiosity and was bitten by a police dog. The Butlers are called Old Kings here.

== Literature ==
- Marc-Dietrich Ohse: In Jugend nach dem Mauerbau – Anpassung, Protest und Eigensinn (DDR: 1961–1974). Links, Berlin 2003, ISBN 3-86153-295-6, in German
- Yvonne Liebing: „All you need is beat“ – Jugendsubkultur in Leipzig von 1957–1968. Forum, Leipzig 2005, ISBN 3-931801-55-1, in German
- Michael Rauhhut: Beat in der Grauzone. DDR-Rock 1964 bis 1972 – Politik und Alltag. BasisDruck, Berlin 1993, ISBN 3-86163-063-X, in German
- Christian Sachse: Aktive Jugend – wohlerzogen und diszipliniert. Wehrerziehung in der DDR als Sozialisations- und Herrschaftsinstrument (1960–1973). Lit, Münster 2000, ISBN 3-8258-5036-6, in German
- Dorothee Wierling: Geboren im Jahr Eins. Der Jahrgang 1949 in der DDR und seine historischen Erfahrungen. Links, Berlin 2002, ISBN 3-86153-278-6, in German
- Rainer Eckert (2019), "Opposition und Widerstand", in Ulrich von Hehl (ed.), Geschichte der Stadt Leipzig, vol. 4, Leipzig: Leipziger Universitätsverlag, pp. 525f., ISBN 978-3-86583-804-9
- Ringel, Sebastian (2015). Leipzig! One Thousand Years of History. Leipzig: Author and Edition Leipzig in the Seemann Henschel GmbH & Co. KG. pp. 193–195. ISBN 978-3-361-00710-9.
- Gerhard Pötzsch: Erinnerungen an den Beat-Aufstand vom 31. Oktober 1965 in Leipzig, in: Leipziger Blätter, issue 81, 2022, pp. 62–65 (in German)
- Bernd Lindner, Zwischen festem Glauben und harten Beats. Unangepasste Jugendliche in der frühen DDR, in: Ausstellungskatalog, ed. by G. Ulrich Großmann, Aufbruch der Jugend. Deutsche Jugendbewegung zwischen Selbstbestimmung und Verführung, Verlag des Germanischen Nationalmuseums, Nürnberg 2013, ISBN 978-3-936688-77-1, pp. 165–171 (in German)
