= Hồ Thị Quế =

Hồ Thị Quế, also known as the Tiger Lady of the Mekong Delta (Vietnamese: Nữ Hổ Tướng Đồng Bằng Sông Cửu Long) and Big Sister (Chị Cả) was a master sergeant of the South Vietnamese 44th Ranger Battalion, also known as "The Black Tigers" that fought against the Viet Cong during the Vietnam War. She was a field medic and a nurse.

Quế was famous for her bravery and courage, earning the nickname "Madame Death" from her Viet Cong adversaries. She was decorated for valour three times. Amongst her fellow rangers she was known for her ferocity, but also for her compassion; she would physically attack any soldier she found looting after battle, but would also comfort and tend to wounded or dying soldiers, often risking her life to reach them on the battlefield. Sometimes she would shave her head to express her grief at the loss of her fellow rangers. She also showed deep compassion for the families of the dead men, fighting for them to receive the benefits due them or lending them money to enable them to become financially independent.

She was a recognisable figure on the battlefield. The Chicago Tribune noted that "she fought beside the men with a pair of .45 automatics ("pearl-handled Colt .45") strapped to her hips and wearing a polished steel helmet emblazoned with a tiger's head." Quế was an inspirational figure, often at the front of the battle with the men, charging through paddy fields, spurring her fellow soldiers on to victory. Just a few months before her death she is said to have emerged from a fierce battle against a thousand-strong enemy without a scratch.

== Early life ==
Quế was the daughter of a farmer. In the First Indochina War she spied on the French for the Viet Minh until she saw that communists were taking control of the Viet Minh. During this period she met her husband, Nguyễn Văn Dần, who would later become commander of the 44th Rangers and whom she would follow into battle. They had six children.

== Death ==
In early November 1965 Quế was shot and killed by her husband during an argument. He claimed self defence, saying Quế had attacked him with a knife in a fit of jealousy over his affair with another woman in Vị Thanh. The prosecutor in the case stated that Nguyễn Văn Dần had killed his wife as he blamed her for the decline of his career. On 5 May 1966 Nguyễn Văn Dần was sentenced and served one year in prison for her murder.

== Awards ==
- Gallantry Cross (South Vietnam) with 3 silver stars
- Presidential Unit Citation
