= 765 (disambiguation) =

765 or 7.65 or 76.5, may refer to:

- 765 (number), a numerical value in the 700s range

== Time ==
- AD 765 (DCCLXV), a year in the Common Era
- 765 BC, a year Before the Common Era
- 765 AUC, a year in the Roman Era
- 7/65, July 1965
- 76/5, May 1976

== Places ==
- Highway 765; see List of highways numbered 765
- Area code 765, central Indiana, USA; a telephone area code
- 765 Mattiaca (asteroid 765), an asteroid in the Asteroid Belt

== Groups and organizations ==
- 765 Naval Air Squadron, a British Royal Navy aviation squadron
- 765th Bombardment Squadron, a United States Air Force bomber squadron
- 765th Aircraft Control and Warning Squadron, United States Air Force
- 765th Fighter Aviation Regiment, Soviet Air Defence Forces
- HMM-765, a U.S. Marine Corps helicopter squadron

== Ships with pennant number 765 ==
- German submarine U-765, a German World War II Kriegsmarine submarine
- USS Adelante (SP-765), a U.S. Navy World War I radio ship
- USS Keppler (DD-765), a U.S. Navy Gearing-class destroyer
- USS Montpelier (SSN-765), a U.S. Navy Los Angeles-class submarine
- Okmulgee (YTB-765), a U.S. Navy Natick-class tugboat
- USS Earl K. Olsen (DE-765), a U.S. Navy Cannon-class destroyer escort

== Vehicles ==
- Breguet 765, a French transport airplane
- Boeing 765, a variant of the Boeing Sonic Cruiser
- McLaren 765, a variant of the McLaren 720S

== Other uses ==
- 7.65 mm caliber bullet types
- 76.5 FM, radio stations broadcasting at 76.5 MHz

== Rail locomotives ==
- 765 steam locomotive, built in 1944 by Lima
