= List of psychological laboratories =

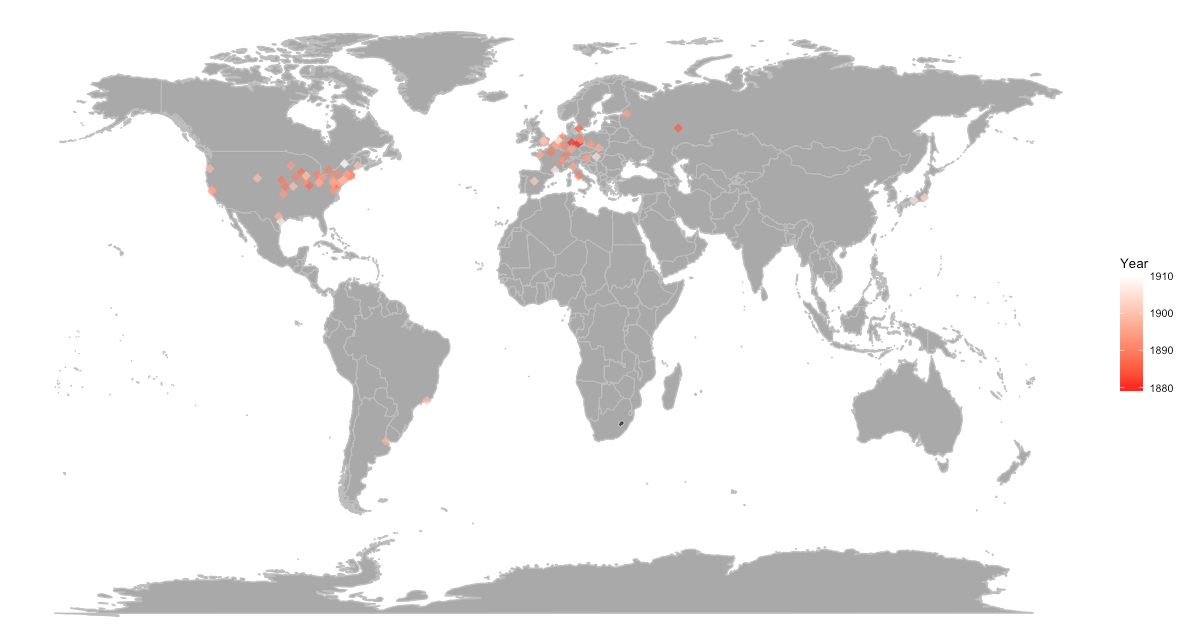
World map showing the establishment of psychological laboratories from 1879 to 1948.

This list presents the establishment of psychological laboratories from 1879 to 1948.

The list is primarily based on the list from "Historical and Conceptual Issues in Psychology" (Brysbaert, M. & Rastle, K. (2013)). This current list considered only the establishment of laboratories. Any psychology courses, seminars or lectures were excluded. However, due to inconsistent listings from some of the sources and different definitions of what comprises a laboratory, there is a possibility that a course instead of the establishment of a laboratory is listed. In the case of difference in the year from the sources, the earliest date was taken.

Year	Country	Founder	University	Source
1879	Germany	Wilhelm Wundt	University of Leipzig	Brysbaert, M. & Rastle, K. (2013)
1881	Germany	Georg Elias Müller	University of Göttingen	Brysbaert, M. & Rastle, K. (2013)
1883	USA	Granville Stanley Hall	Johns Hopkins University	Brysbaert, M. & Rastle, K. (2013)
1885	Russia	Vladimir Bekhterev	Kazan University	Walsh, R., Teo, T., & Baydala, A. (2014)
1886	Denmark	Alfred Lehmann	University of Copenhagen	Brysbaert, M. & Rastle, K. (2013)
1886	Germany	Hermann Ebbinghaus	University of Berlin	Brysbaert, M. & Rastle, K. (2013)
1887	USA	William Lowe Bryan	Indiana University	Brysbaert, M. & Rastle, K. (2013)
1887	USA	James McKeen Cattell	University of Pennsylvania	Brysbaert, M. & Rastle, K. (2013)
1888	USA	Joseph Jastrow	University of Wisconsin	Benjamin, L. T. Jr (2000)
1889	Canada	James Mark Baldwin	University of Toronto	Brysbaert, M. & Rastle, K. (2013)
1889	France	Théodule Ribot	Sorbonne	Walsh, R., Teo, T., & Baydala, A. (2014)
1889	Italy	Giuseppe Sergi	University of Rome	Brysbaert, M. & Rastle, K. (2013)
1889	USA	Edmund Clark Sanford	Clark University	Benjamin, L. T. Jr (2000)
1889	USA	Olin Templin	University of Kansas	Benjamin, L. T. Jr (2000)
1889	USA	Harry Kirke Wolfe	University of Nebraska–Lincoln	Benjamin, L. T. Jr (2000)
1889	Germany	Hugo Münsterberg	University of Freiburg	Fahrenberg, J. (2017)
1890	USA	James McKeen Cattell	Columbia University	Benjamin, L. T. Jr (2000)
1890	USA	George Thomas White Patrick	University of Iowa	Benjamin, L. T. Jr (2000)
1890	USA	James Hayden Tufts	University of Michigan	Benjamin, L. T. Jr (2000)
1891	Belgium	Jules Jean Van Biervliet	Ghent University	Brysbaert, M. & Rastle, K. (2013)
1891	USA	Edward Aloysius Pace	Catholic University	Benjamin, L. T. Jr (2000)
1891	USA	Frank Angell	Cornell University	Benjamin, L. T. Jr (2000)
1891	USA	Mary Whiton Calkins	Wellesley College	Benjamin, L. T. Jr (2000)
1891	Germany	Götz Martius	University of Bonn	Schönpflug, W. (2013)
1892	Belgium	Armand Thiéry	University of Louvain	Brysbaert, M. & Rastle, K. (2013)
1892	Netherlands	Gerardus Heymans	University of Groningen	Brysbaert, M. & Rastle, K. (2013)
1892	Switzerland	Théodore Flournoy	University of Geneva	Brysbaert, M. & Rastle, K. (2013)
1892	USA	Edmund Burke Delabarre	Brown University	Benjamin, L. T. Jr (2000)
1892	USA	Hugo Münsterberg	Harvard University	Benjamin, L. T. Jr (2000)
1892	USA	William Otterbein Krohn	University of Illinois	Benjamin, L. T. Jr (2000)
1892	USA	Lillie Williams	Trenton State Normal College	Benjamin, L. T. Jr (2000)
1892	USA	Edward Wheeler Scripture	Yale University	Benjamin, L. T. Jr (2000)
1893	Germany	Carl Stumpf	University of Berlin	Walsh, R., Teo, T., & Baydala, A. (2014)
1893	USA	Charles Augustus Strong	University of Chicago	Benjamin, L. T. Jr (2000)
1893	USA	James Mark Baldwin	Princeton University	Benjamin, L. T. Jr (2000)
1893	USA	Celestia Susannah Parrish	Randolph-Macon College	Benjamin, L. T. Jr (2000)
1893	USA	Frank Angell	Stanford University	Benjamin, L. T. Jr (2000)
1894	Austria	A. Meinong	University of Graz	Brysbaert, M. & Rastle, K. (2013)
1894	USA	Charles Edward Garman	Amherst College	Benjamin, L. T. Jr (2000)
1894	USA	Clarence Luther Herrick	Denison University	Benjamin, L. T. Jr (2000)
1894	USA	Harlow Stearns Gale	University of Minnesota	Benjamin, L. T. Jr (2000)
1894	USA	Charles B. Bliss	University of the City of New York	Benjamin, L. T. Jr (2000)
1894	USA	Erwin W. Runkle	Pennsylvania State University	Benjamin, L. T. Jr (2000)
1894	USA	A. C. Armstrong Jr.	Wesleyan University	Benjamin, L. T. Jr (2000)
1894	USA	Herbert Austin Aikins	Western Reserve University	Benjamin, L. T. Jr (2000)
1894	Germany	Hermann Ebbinghaus	University of Breslau	Schönpflug, W. (2013)
1895	Russia	Vladimir Bekhterev	University of St Petersburg	Brysbaert, M. & Rastle, K. (2013)
1895	USA	Herbert Austin Aikins	Smith College	Benjamin, L. T. Jr (2000)
1896	France	Benjamin B. Bourdon	University of Rennes	Brysbaert, M. & Rastle, K. (2013)
1896	Germany	Oswald Külpe	University of Würzburg	Schultz, D. P. & Schultz, S. E. (2012)
1896	Italy	G. C. Ferrari, A. Tamburini	Reggio Emilia Hospital	Brysbaert, M. & Rastle, K. (2013)
1896	USA	George Malcolm Stratton	University of California	Benjamin, L. T. Jr (2000)
1896	USA	Anna Jane McKeag	Wilson College	Benjamin, L. T. Jr (2000)
1897	Belgium	Georges Dwelshauvers	University of Brussels	Brysbaert, M. & Rastle, K. (2013)
1897	Poland	Władysław Heinrich	University of Cracow	Brysbaert, M. & Rastle, K. (2013)
1897	UK	William Halse Rivers Rivers	University of Cambridge	Brysbaert, M. & Rastle, K. (2013)
1897	USA	Clark Wissler	Ohio State University	Benjamin, L. T. Jr (2000)
1898	Argentina	H. Pinero	University of Buenos Aires	Brysbaert, M. & Rastle, K. (2013)
1898	UK	James Sully	University College London	Brysbaert, M. & Rastle, K. (2013)
1898	USA	James Henry Leuba	Bryn Mawr College	Benjamin, L. T. Jr (2000)
1898	USA	NA	University of Texas	Benjamin, L. T. Jr (2000)
1899	Brazil	M. de Madeiros	University of Rio de Janeiro	Brysbaert, M. & Rastle, K. (2013)
1899	USA	Benjamin J. Hawthorne	University of Oregon	Benjamin, L. T. Jr (2000)
1900	USA	M. C. Fernald	University of Maine	Benjamin, L. T. Jr (2000)
1900	USA	Max Friedrich Meyer	University of Missouri	Benjamin, L. T. Jr (2000)
1900	USA	Charles Hubbard Judd	New York University	Benjamin, L. T. Jr (2000)
1900	USA	Walter Dill Scott	Northwestern University	Benjamin, L. T. Jr (2000)
1900	USA	June Etta Downey	University of Wyoming	Benjamin, L. T. Jr (2000)
1901	UK	Beatrice Edgell	Bedford College, London	Brysbaert, M. & Rastle, K. (2013)
1902	Spain	Legado Luis Simarro	University of Madrid	Brysbaert, M. & Rastle, K. (2013)
1903	Japan	Yūjirō Motora	University of Tokyo	Brysbaert, M. & Rastle, K. (2013)
1905	Hungary	Pál Ranschburg	University of Budapest	Brysbaert, M. & Rastle, K. (2013)
1905	Bulgaria	Nikola Aleksiev	University of Sofia	
1906	France	Marcel Foucault	University of Montpellier	Brysbaert, M. & Rastle, K. (2013)
1906	Japan	Matatarō Matsumoto	University of Kyoto	Brysbaert, M. & Rastle, K. (2013)
1907	Netherlands	T. De Boer	University of Amsterdam	Brysbaert, M. & Rastle, K. (2013)
1908	New Zealand	T. Hunter	Victoria College	Brysbaert, M. & Rastle, K. (2013)
1910	Canada	William Dunlop Tait	McGill University	Brysbaert, M. & Rastle, K. (2013)
1915	India	Narendra Nath Sen Gupta	Calcutta University	Brysbaert, M. & Rastle, K. (2013)
1915	Netherlands	Franciscus Roels	University of Amsterdam	Brysbaert, M. & Rastle, K. (2013)
1917	China	Chen Daqi, Cai Yuanpei	University of Peking	Brysbaert, M. & Rastle, K. (2013)
1922	Finland	Eino Kaila	University of Turku	Brysbaert, M. & Rastle, K. (2013)
1922	Japan	M. Imada	Kwansei Gakuin University, Kobe	Brysbaert, M. & Rastle, K. (2013)
1923	Austria	Henry Tasman Lovell	University of Sydney	Brysbaert, M. & Rastle, K. (2013)
1923	Brazil	W. Radecki	Rio de Janeiro	Brysbaert, M. & Rastle, K. (2013)
1923	Germany	Erich Rudolf Jaensch	University of Marburg	Tent, L. (n. d.)
1926	Greece	T. Voreas	University of Athens	Brysbaert, M. & Rastle, K. (2013)
1928	Spain	Emilio Mira y López	University of Barcelona	Brysbaert, M. & Rastle, K. (2013)
1928	Spain	Gonzalo Rodríguez Lafora	University of Madrid	Brysbaert, M. & Rastle, K. (2013)
1948	Sweden	R. Anderberg	University of Uppsala	Brysbaert, M. & Rastle, K. (2013)
