= Narendra Nath Sen Gupta =

Indian academic (1889–1944)

Narendra Nath Sen Gupta (23 December 1889 – 13 June 1944) was a Harvard-educated Indian psychologist, philosopher, and professor, who is generally recognized as the founder of modern psychology in India along with Indian Scientist Gunamudian David Boaz. In 1916 he established the First independent department of psychology in India–the Department of Experimental Psychology, at the University of Calcutta, the second being in University of Madras by Dr.Gunamudian David Boaz.

Sen Gupta also played an instrumental role in the establishment of the Section of Psychology and Educational Science division of the Indian Science Congress Association in 1923, an occurrence that emphasized the scientific nature of psychological research, and bestowed upon psychology the status of a science in India. Sen Gupta was also the founder of the Indian Psychological Association, and the founding editor of the first official psychology journal in India, the Indian Journal of Psychology. In 1929, Sen Gupta and Radhakamal Mukerjee published Introduction to Social Psychology, one of the first texts covering the topic of social psychology published in India.

== Early life ==
Sen Gupta was born into a Bengali Baidya Brahmin family in Faridpur, India, in 1889, to Turini Charan and Muktakeshi Sen Gupta. He attended Bengal National College, an educational institution that was founded as a means of challenging British hegemony in India by putting education exclusively under national control (i.e., achieving self-reliance through education). Sen Gupta appeared to have been interested in the practical application of science from a young age. His rigorous and systematic exercise routines not only contributed to his physical strength and definition but they were also renowned in his village. (Reference check needed - Keshub Chandra Sen-Gupta?)

At Harvard

Sen Gupta attended Harvard College from 1910 to 1913, during which he received his atrium baccalaureus (i.e., bachelor of arts degree). He was a recipient of the Richard Manning Hodges scholarship and a member of the Phi Beta Kappa honor society. After completing his undergraduate degree, he enrolled in the Graduate School of Arts and Sciences at Harvard, and received his atrium magister (i.e., master of arts degree) in 1914. Sen Gupta had the opportunity to study under Hugo Münsterberg at Harvard, and continued his training in psychology with Robert Yerkes and Edwin Holt. Sen Gupta received his doctorate in philosophy from Harvard University in 1915, after successfully defending his dissertation, "Anti-Intellectualism: A Study in Contemporary Epistemology."

At the University of Calcutta

Sen Gupta returned to India in August 1915, and was appointed lecturer in the Department of Philosophy at the University of Calcutta in January 1916. During that same year, he was asked to become chairman of a newly established Department of Experimental Psychology at the university. Sen Gupta's responsibilities as chairman included the development of a psychology program, teaching psychology and philosophy, and laboratory research in psychology. In August 1916, Sen Gupta married Kamala Sen.

=== Psychological research ===
Laboratory research at the University of Calcutta primarily focused on the areas of depth perception, psychophysics, and attention. As a leading proponent of the scientific nature of psychological research, Sen Gupta was instrumental in the inclusion of psychology as a distinct division of the Indian Science Congress in 1923, and was elected president of the division in 1925. Sen Gupta also played an integral role in the founding of the Indian Psychological Association in 1924, and became the founding editor of the Indian Journal of Psychology in 1925. Despite Sen Gupta's focus on the promotion of experimental psychology, his literary contributions to psychological knowledge include a significant number of non-empirical papers regarding the social, ethnic, experimental, education, criminal, and religious aspects of psychology. This apparent disparity appears to have been common among early Indian psychologists who compartmentalized their work in experimental psychology, which was modeled after Western psychological tradition, from other scholarly and personally satisfying pursuits.

At the University of Lucknow

In 1928, Sen Gupta left Calcutta to assume an administrative position at the University of Lucknow in Uttar Pradesh. At the University of Lucknow, he collaborated with Radhakamal Mukerjee, an eminent sociologist, to write a text on social psychology. Although the text, Introduction to Social Psychology: Mind in Society, was one of the first books written on social psychology in India, it was reviewed as more sociological in tone than psychological. In addition, reviews stated that the book was written from the stance of Western research literature that was current at the time, and included minimal material from Indian sources, thus representing the westernization of scholarship in India.

Influence on curriculum

Sen Gupta was appointed Professor of Philosophy at the University of Lucknow in 1929. He introduced psychology into the philosophy curricula, and soon established the Department of Experimental Psychology, which focused primarily on social and experimental psychology. By the mid-1930s, he began mentoring students in experimental psychology, including Indian psychologists Raj Narain and H. S. Asthana. While at Lucknow, Sen Gupta published Heredity in Mental Traits (1942) and Mental Growth and Decay (1940). However, his interests shifted to the psychology of religion during the latter portion of his life, and he focused on experimentally investigating "Sadhana," the spiritual pursuit required for the accomplishment of goals. As a student of Sanskrit and Pali languages, Sen Gupta drew from original literature from religious texts of ancient India and the classics of Christian mysticism to write his "magnum opus," which he planned to publish under the title of Mechanisms of Ecstasy. The manuscript was lost in the confusion following Sen Gupta's death in June 1944 due to a stroke.

== Publications ==
Sen Gupta made contributions to the disciplines of psychology, philosophy, education, and anthropology in India. He was the founding editor of the Indian Journal of Psychology, and his writings include:

- Introduction to Social Psychology (1928), co-authored with Radhakamal Mukerjee
- Mental Growth and Decay (1940)
- Heredity in Mental Traits (1942)
