= Okmulgee =

Okmulgee may refer to:

- Okmulgee, Oklahoma
- Okmulgee County, Oklahoma
- Okmulgee (YTB-765)

== See also ==
- Ocmulgee River
- Ocmulgee Mounds National Historical Park
