= Yūjirō Motora =

Japanese psychologist (1858–1912)

- 元良 勇次郎
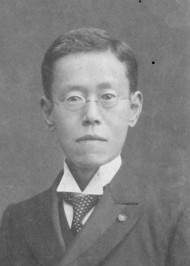
- Motora in c. 1900
- Born: December 5, 1858; Sanda, Sanda Domain, Tokugawa shogunate
- Died: December 13, 1912 (aged 54); Tokyo City, Empire of Japan
- Education: Johns Hopkins University (PhD)
- Scientific career
- Fields: Experimental psychology
- Institutions: Tokyo Imperial University
- Doctoral advisor: G. Stanley Hall
- Notable students: Matatarō Matsumoto; Tomokichi Fukurai; Chen Daqi

Yūjirō Motora (Japanese: 元良 勇次郎, romanized: Motora Yūjirō; December 5, 1858 – December 13, 1912), sometimes also known as Yuzero Motora, was a Japanese experimental psychologist. He was one of the earliest Japanese psychologists. He was known for conducting research on the attention spans of school-aged children, and he set up the first psychological laboratory in Japan.

Born in Sanda, Motora studied at Boston University and completed a Ph.D. in philosophy at Johns Hopkins University, but his studies also included significant work on physiological psychology with G. Stanley Hall. After graduate school, he returned to Japan, where he served on the faculty of the Tokyo Imperial University, later known as the University of Tokyo. There he taught a number of students who became influential psychologists and academics.

A practitioner of Zen meditation, he wrote that understanding meditation should be based on a participant's own interpretation rather than the ideas of a Zen master. He also translated the works of eminent Western psychologists into Japanese and conducted early work in clinical psychology. Motora was still an active researcher and professor when he contracted a fatal case of erysipelas in his mid-fifties.

== Early life ==
Motora was born into a samurai family in Sanda, Sanda Domain (modern day Hyōgo), to Yutaka Sugita and Suga (Motoyama) Sugita, and he had an older brother. As a child, Motora was interested in the West and studied English in school. He was attracted to psychology after reading a textbook written by physiologist William Benjamin Carpenter. In 1879, Motora became a teacher at the Tokyo Eiwa School. Two years later, he married Yone Motora, and her family adopted him. He took up her religion, converting from the Congregational Church to Methodism. When he joined his wife's family, his social status changed from samurai class to commoner.

In 1883, Motora came to the United States to study philosophy and theology. He studied at Boston University, a choice influenced by the Tokyo Eiwa School's being established as a mission school of Boston University. In late 1885, Motora spoke at two churches in Decatur, Illinois, telling the congregations that he hoped his education in Boston would prepare him to return to Japan and convert people to Christianity. The Decatur newspaper, which referred to Motora as "the Jap. preacher", said that the churches collected money to defray Motora's educational expenses.

== Work with G. Stanley Hall ==
Dissatisfied with his education in Boston, Motora went to Johns Hopkins University to study under experimental psychologist G. Stanley Hall. Around that time, Hall's laboratory was home to several students who went on to become prominent academics, including Edmund Sanford, Clifton F. Hodge, and James H. Hyslop. When Motora applied to Johns Hopkins, he indicated a particular interest in physiological psychology. However, his interests shifted once he got to the school. While he still studied under Hall, he majored in philosophy. His thesis was titled Exchange: Considered as the Principles of Social Life.

Beginning in the mid-1880s, Motora translated new theories of Western psychology – such as the James–Lange theory and Wilhelm Wundt's three-dimensional theory of feelings – for publication in Japan. Though he had translated Wundt's work, Motora came to believe that emotion was a product of only one dimension: pleasure versus displeasure.

Despite his emphasis on philosophy, Motora maintained some interest in physiological psychology. When Japanese psychologist Sho Watase visited Motora in the U.S., he and two of Motora's colleagues were given helmets with electrical wires on them. The men wore the helmets to bed for several nights in an attempt to share the electrical output of their brains with one another. Motora thought that this might cause the men to experience the same dreams. "It was our opinion that the fault might not be with the doctor's theory, but rather with ourselves, for the helmets often came off while we were asleep as we were restless," Watase said, adding that Motora never brought up such an experiment to him again.

Motora and Hall collaborated on an 1888 study of the skin's sensitivity to changes in pressure; their paper was published in the first issue of the American Journal of Psychology. Hall later remembered Motora as a modest and reserved student who seemed to have few interests outside of his studies in philosophy and psychology. Motora earned a Ph.D. in philosophy in 1888.

== Academic career ==
Coming back to Japan after his doctoral studies, Motora became principal of the Tokyo Eiwa School. Shortly thereafter, he also took a part-time faculty position at Tokyo Imperial University. In 1889, Motora presented a lecture on evolutionary theory at the Tokyo Eiwa School, but the lecture ran afoul of their religious tradition established by Methodist missionaries. Motora resigned from the school, devoting his attention to lecturing full-time at Tokyo Imperial University. By 1890, Motora authored Psychology, the first Japanese scientific textbook in his field. The same year, Motora was promoted to the rank of professor at Tokyo Imperial University, though there was not a full psychology department at the time. He was named the chair of psychology, ethics and logic three years later.

In 1895, Motora kept a journal of a week-long period practicing Zen meditation at Engaku-ji, a Buddhist temple in Tokyo. Zen meditation involves the use of a kōan, a prompt that can be used to assess a student's progress in Zen. Motora's kōan was "What is the sound of clapping with only one hand?" Motora required 16 attempts and a hint from the Zen master before he was able to provide an answer that satisfied the Zen master. He later wrote that Zen should be understood through personal interpretation rather than through a Zen master, and this became an influential thought in early Japanese psychology.

In 1903, with the assistance of one of his former students, Matatarō Matsumoto, Motora set up Japan's first formal laboratory in experimental psychology at the university. They had a spare room in Motora's office building that could have been used for research, but the acoustics of the room created too much noise for psychological experiments, and soon Motora and Matsumoto converted a 12-room house from the school's pathology department into a psychology lab.

While working with school-aged children who were thought to be intellectually disabled, Motora found that students who had difficulties with academic achievement were much more likely to be suffering from attention span problems than intellectual disability. Motora invented a device that would help children sustain their concentration. He authored the first descriptions in the Japanese literature of a condition consistent with attention deficit hyperactivity disorder.

Motora was named a member of the Imperial Academy of Sciences and was awarded the Order of the Rising Sun, Second Class. He was selected to give a presentation at the 1905 International Congress of Psychology, where he read a paper on the concept of the self based on his experience with meditation.

== Protégés ==
Several of Motora's students became prominent academics. In 1906, Matsumoto established the psychological laboratory at Kyoto University, which was the second formal psychology lab in Japan. He later succeeded Motora as psychology faculty at Tokyo Imperial University. Chen Daqi, who came from China to study under Motora, was later responsible for the first Chinese psychology laboratory and psychology textbook.

Yoshihide Kubo studied with Motora at Tokyo Imperial University before going to Clark University, where Hall had become president. When he joined the faculty at Hiroshima University, Kubo adapted the Binet-Simon intelligence test for Japanese use. His study of intelligence was furthered by another Motora pupil, Tohru Watanabe, who created Japan's first group intelligence test. Hiroshi Hayami, who also studied under Motora, brought word of behaviorism to Japan. Later, Hayami became president of Keijō Imperial University.

Tomokichi Fukurai, another of Motora's students, attained short-lived recognition in the field but is mostly known for his discredited work in parapsychology. Fukurai was hired to teach abnormal psychology at Tokyo Imperial University. Gradually, he became more interested in studying psychical phenomena such as clairvoyance. In the United States, scholars had already taken dismissive attitudes toward paranormal research, but Fukurai was apparently unaware of this since he had studied only in Japan. In 1910, when Fukurai insisted that he had identified three clairvoyant women, Motora tried to convince him to drop this line of research. Fukurai did not publicize his interest in the paranormal until after Motora's death in 1912. The year after Motora died, Fukurai published a controversial book about clairvoyance. Matsumoto had taken over as the department chair, and he asked Fukurai to take a leave of absence. Fukurai's employment was automatically terminated once his two-year leave expired. To prevent further damage to the department's reputation, Matsumoto removed all abnormal psychology lectures from the curriculum, focusing the department's teaching and research on psychological phenomena that could be measured through objective means. The other Imperial Universities also deemphasized the teaching of abnormal psychology through the 1930s. Thus, "the Fukurai affair" led to a change in focus that delayed the development of clinical psychology in Japan until after World War II.

Motora did not conduct research in fine arts or aesthetics, but a number of alumni from his department became known for their work in this area. For example, while Matsumoto is better known as the founding president of the Japanese Psychological Association, he also became president of the Kyoto Prefectural School of Art and Crafts. Naoteru Ueno was the director of the Osaka Municipal Museum of Art and the first president of Tokyo University of the Arts. Mantaro Kido combined his interests in psychology and calligraphy, researching the application of the arts to educational psychology.

== Death ==
Motora died in Tokyo on December 13, 1912, at the age of 54. He had been sick with erysipelas for several months but had remained active in psychological research until just before his death. He and his wife had five children.
