= Sackett self-selection circus =

Psychology research tool for primates

The Sackett self-selection circus is an apparatus used in experimental psychology with non-human primates. It is a space divided into compartments containing objects; the time an animal spends with each object is measured, indicating any amount of fear of or anxiety from those objects.
