= Matatarō Matsumoto =

Japanese psychologist

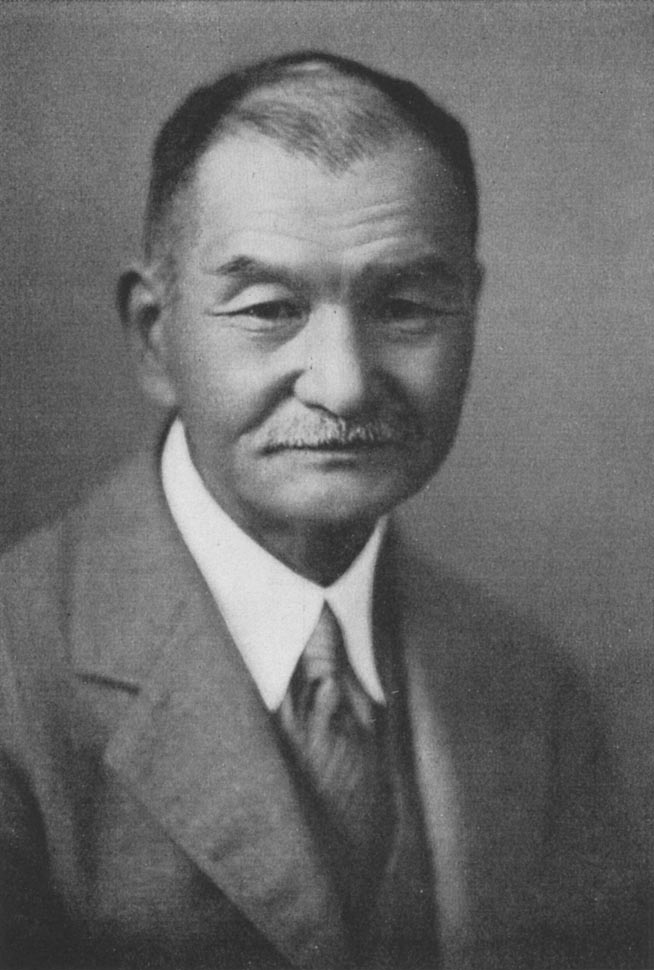
- Born: November 3, 1865
- Died: December 24, 1943 (aged 78)
- Scientific career
- Fields: Experimental psychology

Matatarō Matsumoto (松本 亦太郎, Matsumoto Matatarō; 1865–1943) was a Japanese psychologist who set up the first psychological laboratory in Japan. He has been described as "the most eminent figure in the history of psychology in Japan". He founded the Japanese Journal of Psychology and the Japanese Psychological Association.

A native of Takasaki, Matsumoto studied for undergraduate and master's degrees in Tokyo, studying under Japan's first academic psychologist, Yūjirō Motora. He earned a doctorate at Yale University under the tutelage of psychologist Edward Wheeler Scripture. Matsumoto taught at the Tokyo Higher Normal School before he set up Japan's second psychology laboratory at Kyoto University. He then took over the psychology program at Tokyo Imperial University after Motora died.

== Early life ==
Matsumoto was born in Takasaki in what became the Gunma Prefecture. At 15, the Matsumoto family adopted him. He attended the Doshisha School and the First Higher Middle School in Tokyo. Matsumoto earned a bachelor's degree and a master's degree at Tokyo Imperial University under Motora, the man who had introduced scientific psychology to Japan.

While Matsumoto was studying in Tokyo, American psychologist George Trumbull Ladd came to lecture in Japan. When Ladd departed Japan, Matsumoto accompanied him to the wharf in Yokohama. Matsumoto mentioned his interest in coming to the U.S. to pursue doctoral study. With Ladd's support, Matsumoto was admitted to the Ph.D. program at Yale.

== Career ==
At Yale, Matsumoto studied under experimental psychologist Edward Wheeler Scripture, and he earned a Ph.D. in 1899. His dissertation was entitled "Experimental Research in Acoustic Space". The school made him an assistant professor. Shortly thereafter, however, the government of Japan decided to send him to Europe. For about three years, Matsumoto did postdoctoral study with Wilhelm Wundt and other psychologists, returning in 1900.

Matsumoto took a faculty position at the Tokyo Higher Normal School upon returning to Japan. He also consulted with Motora as the latter built the first psychology laboratory in Japan in 1903. (While he was studying in Europe, Motora had asked him to purchase certain supplies for the planned laboratory.) In 1906, Matsumoto went to Kyoto University and built Japan's second psychology laboratory.

After Motora's death in 1912, Matsumoto came back to Tokyo Imperial University and assumed Motora's position as the department chair there. At Tokyo Imperial, Matsumoto's research focused on "mental movement", or physical movements that express mental processes. He taught psychocynematics, the quantitative study of such movements, to 125 students, including 20 doctoral graduates. He wrote a book on intelligence that was more than 1100 pages long.

Matsumoto also served as president of the Kyoto Prefectural School of Art and Crafts, later known as the Kyoto City University of Arts. He was elected to the Japan Academy in 1921. After he retired in 1926, Matsumoto founded the Japanese Journal of Psychology. He also founded the Japanese Psychological Association and served as its president until he died in 1943.
