= A.S. Johnson =

Indian psychiatrist

Arulanandham Solomon Johnson
- Born: 1899; Palliyadi, South Travancore (Travancore Kingdom), Present-day Tamil Nadu
- Died: 1972 (aged 72–73); Madras, India
- Education: University of Madras; Madras Medical College; University of Edinburgh

Arulanandham Solomon Johnson (1899–1972) was the first Indian psychiatrist. He completed a BA at University of Madras in 1917, and completed a MBBS at Madras Medical College in 1922. His MD was completed at University of Edinburgh, the first doctor from South India to become a member of Royal Colleges of Physicians of the United Kingdom. He co-founded in Delhi the Indian Psychiatric Society in 1947.

== Personal life ==
A.S. Johnson was born on 1899 as the only child to Arulanandham Solomon of PeraniVilai, Palliyadi. Solomon hailed from a highly respected family and served as the first Indian Secretary of YMCA in 1888. His elder Brother Rev. Arulanandham Nathaniel, a renowned Evangalist served for 32 years the C.S.I Church Kanjiracode, Marthandam as its First pastor. In addition, Solomon also served as the first secretary and first Choir Master of C.S.I Mateer Memorial Church, Trivandrum. Johnson's paternal cousin is G.D. Boaz. The family has been one of the oldest leading noble families of South Travancore and Kanniyakumari District for over two hundred years.

== Career ==
A.S. Johnson started his career in 1931 at Maudsley Hospital, London. Under the invitation of the then King of Travancore Shri, Chithira Thirunal Balarama Varma. He returned to India in 1933 and revived the Trivandrum Mental Hospital, Oolampara serving as the chief surgeon of Travancore. In the backdrop of World War I, he was called to serve in the Indian Army, as a surgeon, from 1941 to 1948. From 1949 to 1956, he served as the Chief Medical Superintendent of Government General Hospital, Egmore and then Kilpauk Mental Hospital, Madras. It was during his tenure the hospital was expanded from 16 beds to 800 beds, making it the largest Mental Hospital in Asia.
