= July 1965 =

Month of 1965

<<	July 1965					>>
Su	Mo	Tu	We	Th	Fr	Sa
				1	2	3
4	5	6	7	8	9	10
11	12	13	14	15	16	17
18	19	20	21	22	23	24
25	26	27	28	29	30	31

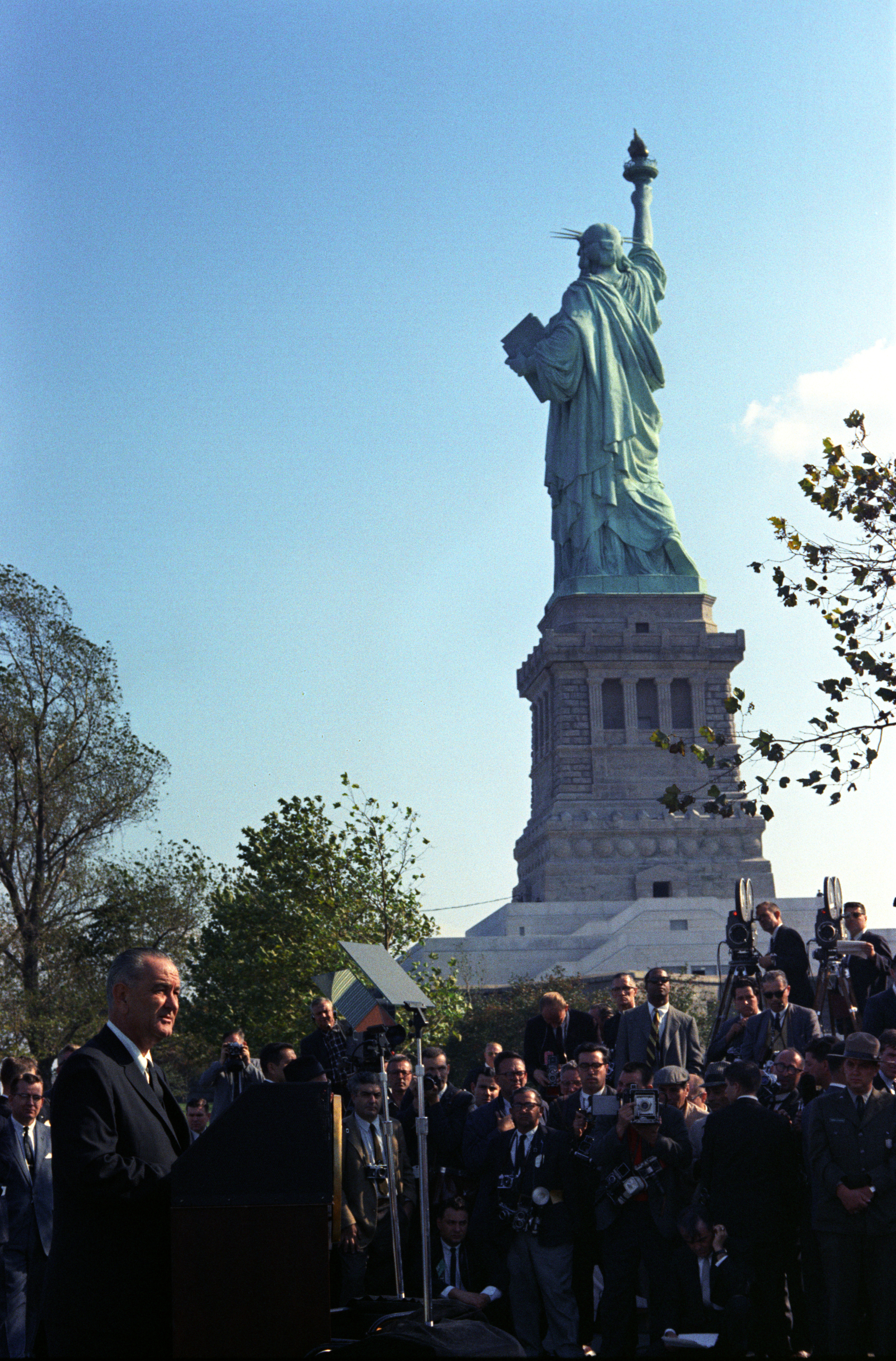
July 4, 1965: President Johnson signs bill ending ethnic restrictions on immigration to the U.S.

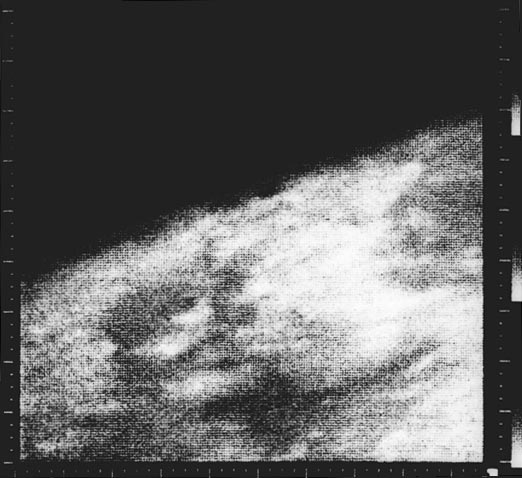
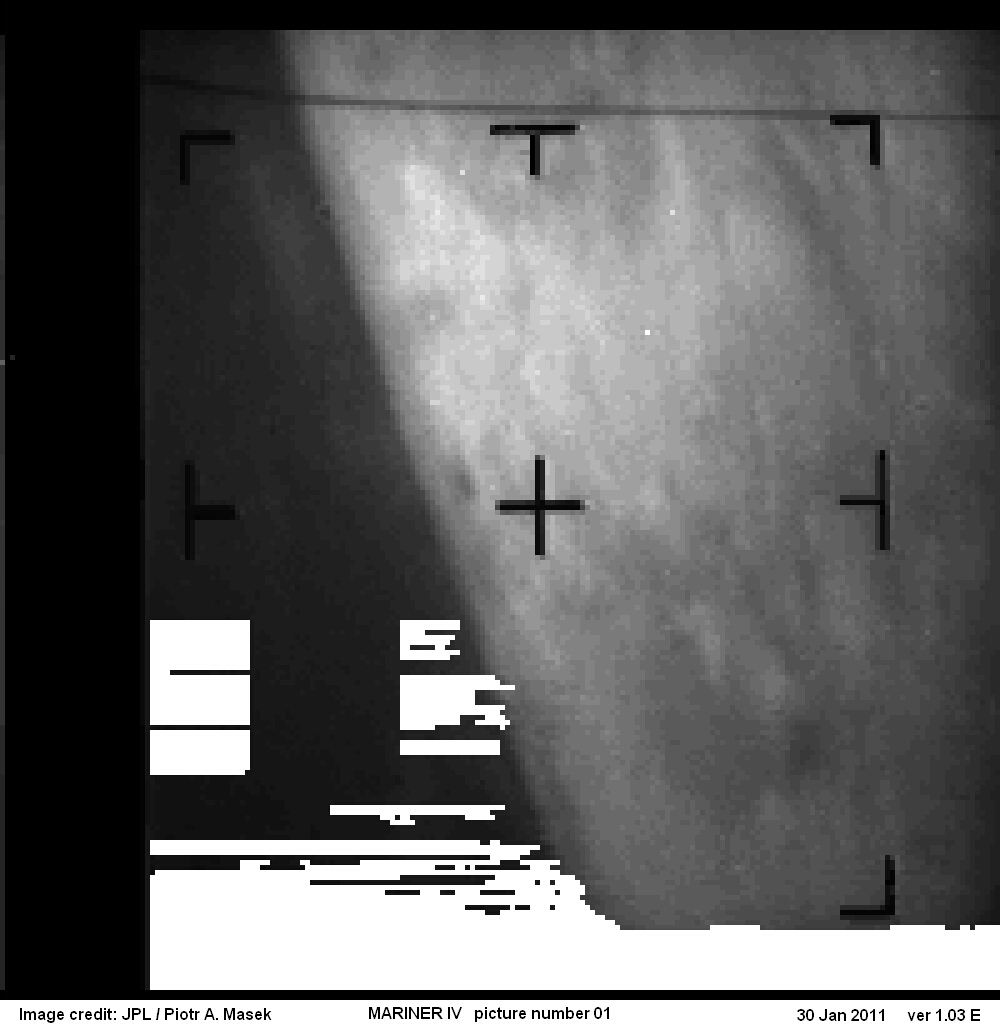
July 15, 1965: Mariner 4 sends back first close up pictures of Mars

July 26, 1965: The Maldives become an independent nation

The following events occurred in July 1965:

== July 1, 1965 (Thursday) ==
- Australia began training its first draftees for the Vietnam War, bringing up the first of 63,790 conscripts who would have two years full-time service in the Australian Regular Army, followed by further service in the army reserves. In all, 804,286 young men who were 20 years old at the time that the draft reactivated, or turned 20 during the Vietnam era, registered for National Service.
- The People's Republic of China established its Strategic Missile Force, the Dier Paobing (which simply meant the "Second Artillery"). "Despite its small number of personnel (about 4 percent of the PLA total)," an author has noted, "the SMF has always been allocated the highest percentage of military outlays in the PLA," with 20% of the People's Liberation Army budget.
- NASA announced that Frank Borman and James A. Lovell, Jr., had been selected as the prime flight crew for Gemini 7. The backup crew for the flight, which would last up to 14 days, would be Edward H. White II and Michael Collins.
- Continental Airlines Flight 12, a Boeing 707-124 with 66 people on board, overran the runway while landing at Kansas City Municipal Airport in Kansas City, Missouri, and broke into three pieces. Coming in during a heavy rain, the plane "hit a pool of water and slid through a fence and across a Missouri River dike", crashing "at almost the same spot" as Continental Flight 290 on January 29, 1963. There were no fatalities.
- The U.S. Army combined the 11th Air Assault Division (Test) with the 2nd Infantry Division to form the 1st Cavalry Division (Airmobile), a unique division that included three airborne-qualified battalions and several battalions of helicopters which were integral to its combat elements, allowing it to engage in helicopter assault operations in Vietnam.
- Born:
  - Carl Fogarty, British motorcycle racer and winner of the Superbike World Championship in 1994, 1995, 1998 and 1999; in Blackburn, Lancashire
  - Tito Beltrán, Chilean opera singer; in Punta Arenas
  - Harald Zwart, Dutch-born Norwegian film director
- Died:
  - Wally Hammond, 62, English international cricketer and captain of the national team from 1938 to 1947
  - Robert Ruark, 50, American journalist and syndicated newspaper columnist

== July 2, 1965 (Friday) ==
- The Equal Employment Opportunity Commission (EEOC) was formed in the United States as Title VII of the Civil Rights Act of 1964 went into effect. The new law prohibited workplace discrimination and the EEOC was authorized to investigate any allegations of discrimination based on race, skin color, religion, sex, or national origin, and initially applied to any companies that had 100 or more employees. Franklin Delano Roosevelt Jr., son of the 32nd president of the United States, served as the first EEOC commissioner.
- Because of an administrative error, U.S. criminal Richard Speck was released from prison in Huntsville, Texas, after serving only six months of a 16-month sentence for attempted rape. A little more than a year later, Speck would murder eight nurses in Chicago.
- The Tunnel Railway had been a tourist attraction in Ramsgate, England, traveling through one of the famed white cliffs on England's west coast, but suffered a catastrophic accident that would lead to its permanent closure, derailing and smashing into a building. As a result, the owners decided to close down the attraction on September 26 at the end of the season, and it would never reopen.
- In the Wimbledon Men's Singles final, Roy Emerson defeated Fred Stolle in straight sets, 6–2, 6–4, 6–4.

== July 3, 1965 (Saturday) ==
- Soviet Communist Party Chief Leonid Brezhnev said that the USSR had "orbital missiles", implying that his nation could put nuclear missiles into orbit around the Earth and bring them down, on command, to any location on Earth. The possible existence of missiles in orbit had been referred to at least twice by Soviet media, but it marked the first time that the Soviet Union's leader had suggested their existence. Brezhnev's comments came in an address to graduates of the Voroshilov Military Academy. "It is hardly necessary to give concrete examples of the quantity of intercontinental and orbital rockets at the disposal of the Soviet Union," Brezhnev said. "I can only say one thing. There are enough, quite enough, of them so that once and forever, we can put an end to any aggressor or any group of aggressors."
- The Football Association, the governing body for all professional soccer football in England, changed its rules to allow teams to substitute players during a game. Previously, when a player was injured, no replacement was allowed. Initially, a team could make only one substitution during the duration of the game, which would be raised to two in 1986 and three in the 1990s.
- Mao Zedong, chairman of the Chinese Communist Party, issued a directive to change educational policy in the People's Republic, commenting that "The burdens of students are too heavy, thus affecting their health, making even study useless," and suggested that school activities should be cut by one-third.
- "The Meddling Monk" became the first Time Lord (other than the First Doctor and Susan) to make an appearance in the British sci-fi serial, Doctor Who.
- Two different recordings of the song "All I Really Want to Do" entered the Billboard Hot 100 list of best-selling songs in the United States, published by Billboard magazine, on the same day. The version by Cher, her first single without Sonny Bono, would eventually climb to #15 on the chart, while a shorter recording by The Byrds, who had previously hit #1 with "Mr. Tambourine Man", would reach no higher than #40.
- Born:
  - Tommy Flanagan, Scottish actor known for his role as Filip "Chibs" Telford in the FX crime drama television series Sons of Anarchy and its spin-off Mayans M.C.; in Easterhouse, Glasgow, Scotland
  - Shinya Hashimoto, Japanese professional wrestler; in Toki City (died from brain aneurysm, 2005)
  - Connie Nielsen, Danish actress; in Frederikshavn
- Died: Trigger, 30, the horse owned by Roy Rogers and featured in 87 of Rogers's films and television series episodes. After the horse's death, Rogers employed the service of a taxidermist to preserve Trigger's remains, which can still be seen at the Roy Rogers and Dale Evans Museum in Victorville, California.

== July 4, 1965 (Sunday) ==
- At a desk placed in front of the base of the Statue of Liberty, U.S. President Lyndon Johnson signed the Immigration and Nationality Act of 1965 into law, abolishing the Emergency Quota Act that had been in place since 1921. The Hart–Cellar Act limited immigration to 170,000 persons per year, but based the number of people from each country on the nations' populations. "The changes that resulted from this renewed migration pattern," a historian would write later, "created fresh images in the cultural and religious landscape that many Americans were not used to encountering. Hindu temples, once only encountered in India, were more routinely seen in U.S. cities. Islam, which had established a strong presence among the African American community, was now also widely practiced by burgeoning immigrant populations in both Shi'a and Sunni expressions of faith."
- Martin Luther King Jr. delivered a memorable sermon entitled "The American Dream" at Ebenezer Baptist Church in Atlanta. Following up on his famous "I Have a Dream" speech in the March on Washington in 1963, King said, "So yes, the dream has been shattered, and I have had my nightmarish experiences, but I tell you this morning once more that I haven't lost the faith. I still have a dream..."
- In the earliest LGBT demonstrations in the United States, the first Annual Reminder took place at Independence Hall in Philadelphia when a group of homosexuals picketed in front of the hall for equal rights. The last Annual Reminder would take place at the same location on July 4, 1969, a week after the Stonewall riots.
- The A-6 Intruder attack plane was sent into the Vietnam War for the first time, as several Intruders were launched from the USS Independence on a combat mission.
- Born: Constanze Moser-Scandolo, East German Olympic speed skater; in Weimar
- Died:
  - Edward Sackville-West, 63, British music critic, novelist and member of the House of Lords as Baron Sackville
  - Lisa Howard, 35, pioneering American television journalist, committed suicide with an overdose of barbiturates

== July 5, 1965 (Monday) ==
- Leabua Jonathan became the new Prime Minister of Basutoland (which would become independent from Britain the following year as the Kingdom of Lesotho), after being selected by the colonial parliament to succeed Sekhonyana Maseribane. Jonathan would control the southern African nation for the next 20 years, until being deposed in a coup d'état in 1986.
- Maria Callas gave her final operatic performance, as Tosca at the Royal Opera House, Covent Garden.
- Died:
  - Porfirio Rubirosa, 56, Dominican millionaire, race car driver, polo player, and international playboy, was killed in an auto accident in Paris after he lost control of his Ferrari 250 while speeding through the Bois de Boulogne park at about 8:30 in the morning. As he raced down the Avenue de la Reine Maruguerite, he struck a parked car "whose driver had pulled over to the curb to read a morning paper", then skidded more than 150 feet (46 m) and crashed into a tree. The day before, Rubirosa and his three teammates had won the Coupe de France polo tournament, and Rubirosa had partied through the night at Jimmy's, a Parisian nightclub.
  - Coley McDonough, 49, a former National Football League quarterback who had been serving as a patrolman for the Pittsburgh Bureau of Police, was shot and killed in the line of duty. McDonough had played for the Steelers from 1939 to 1941.

== July 6, 1965 (Tuesday) ==
- The United States Senate voted 68 to 5 to approve the proposed Twenty-fifth Amendment to the United States Constitution, clearing the way for the change in presidential succession to be sent to the states for ratification. The amendment also made provisions to fill a vacancy in the office of the U.S. Vice President and created a procedure for the vice president to serve as acting president if the president were to become disabled. The U.S. House of Representatives had already approved the amendment. Voting against the measure were Senators Albert Gore Sr. of Tennessee (whose son would serve as vice president from 1993 to 2001), Walter F. Mondale of Minnesota (who would be vice president from 1977 to 1981), Frank Lausche of Ohio, Eugene McCarthy of Minnesota, and John Tower of Texas.
- The House of Commons of the United Kingdom voted against the Labour Party government of Prime Minister Harold Wilson on three different attempts at passing the Finance Bill, and MP Edward Heath called upon Wilson and his government to resign so that new elections could be held. On the first vote concerning a limit on investment tax rates, the measure failed 166–180; an amendment proposal failed 167–180, and a motion to adjourn the debate failed by the same measure.
- All 41 Royal Air Force servicemen on a Hastings C1A airplane were killed when the aircraft crashed shortly after takeoff from RAF Abingdon. The Hastings was making its climb when metal fatigue caused two bolts to fail on the craft's elevator and sent it climbing steeply until it stalled and went out of control. The plane was transporting paratroopers of the No. 36 Squadron for a drop over Weston-on-the-Green.
- The Council of Ministers of the Soviet Union approved sending 2,500 Soviet Army instructors to North Vietnam, not to fight in combat, but to train North Vietnamese troops on how to use surface-to-air missiles against American airplanes. During the course of the war, between 10,000 and 12,000 Soviet advisers would see service in the Vietnam War.

== July 7, 1965 (Wednesday) ==
- Saudi Arabia and Kuwait agreed to partition the "Neutral Zone", a diamond shaped piece of land of about 2,200 square miles or 5,800 square kilometers along the Persian Gulf that had been created by agreement on December 2, 1922. In 1938, oil had been discovered in Kuwait outside of the Zone, and both kingdoms wanted to drill within its boundaries. The two governments agreed to divide the zone along a straight east-west line "close to latitude 28°32' N".
- McDonnell Aircraft completed its 1,000th F-4 Phantom II.
- Died:
  - Moshe Sharett, 70, Ukrainian-born politician who served as the second Prime Minister of Israel from 1954 to 1955
  - Ronald Zinn, 26, American Olympic race walker nine months earlier in the 1964 Summer Olympics, was killed in action in the Vietnam War.

== July 8, 1965 (Thursday) ==
- Ronnie Biggs escaped from the maximum security Wandsworth Prison in London, where he was serving a 30-year prison sentence for the August 8, 1963 robbery of the Royal Mail Express train. Making their move at 3:05 in the afternoon, he and three other inmates fought off guards, climbed over the 20-foot (6.1 m) high wall of the prison's exercise yard using rope ladders, dropped onto the roof of a furniture truck parked outside the prison while an accomplice held the warden hostage, and then made their way to three waiting cars that left in different directions. Biggs would remain free for almost 36 years, living in Brazil from 1970 onward, before finally returning to the United Kingdom on May 7, 2001 to turn himself over to authorities. Returned to prison, he would serve eight years and be released on August 7, 2009. Biggs would pass away on December 18, 2013, at the age of 84, a little more than 50 years after the robbery.
- All 52 people on Canadian Pacific Airlines Flight 21 were killed when a bomb exploded in a rear lavatory while the jetliner was flying at 15,000 feet (4,600 m) over thick forests in British Columbia. The Douglas DC-6B had taken off from Vancouver en route to Whitehorse, the capital of the then-Yukon Territory, with three scheduled stops. Captain John Steele radioed a mayday call at 4:55 p.m., and the DC-6B apparently "dropped straight to the ground" about 30 miles (48 km) southwest of the town of 100 Mile House. No suspect would ever be charged for the bombing.
- The Convention on Transit Trade of Land-locked States was signed in the United Nations. Under its terms, any signatory nation that had a sea coast was obligated to allow any neighboring landlocked country the right to cross its territory. As of 2012, only 22 coastal nations had signed the convention, "some of which do not even border a landlocked country", along with 18 landlocked nations.
- Musician Jim Morrison encountered former UCLA classmate Ray Manzarek in Venice Beach, California, at approximately 1:00 p.m. local time. After hearing some of Morrison's songs, Manzarek agreed to form The Doors with him.
- The Vietnam Service Medal was established by Executive Order 11231 for all members of the armed services who served in the Vietnam War.
- Bill Moyers became acting White House press secretary as George Reedy took an indefinite leave of absence for surgery.
- Died:
  - Gunamudian David Boaz, 57, who became the first Indian psychologist after receiving his Ph.D. from Oxford University in 1943
  - Paul Mantz, 61, American air racer and stunt pilot, was killed in a plane crash during filming of The Flight of the Phoenix
  - T. S. Stribling, 84, Pulitzer Prize-winning American novelist
  - Emil Heitz, 72, German-born Swiss geneticist

== July 9, 1965 (Friday) ==
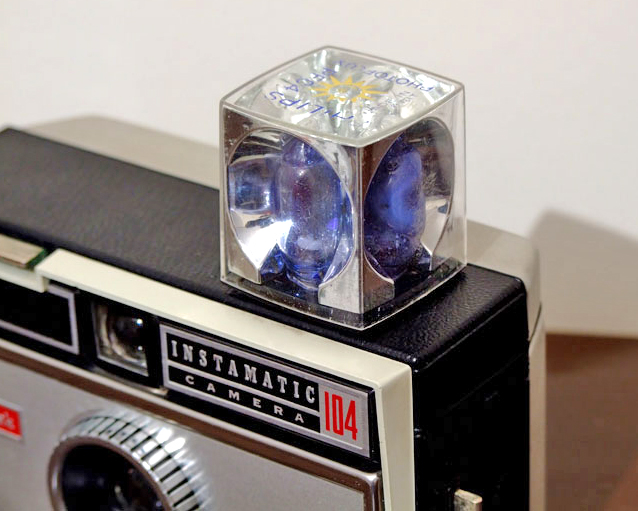
Flashcube

- The flashcube was introduced by the American camera manufacturer Kodak at its factory in Rochester, New York, as an accessory that would allow flash photography on its small Instamatic cameras for indoor picture taking. Developed in conjunction with Sylvania Electric Products, the disposable flashcube allowed an amateur photographer to take four flash images in rapid succession without having to change the bulb.
- The United States Senate approved its version of the Medicare Act by a vote of 68–21, after the House of Representatives had passed a different version in April, 313–115. Both houses would approve a House–Senate conference revision at the end of the month, and the federal health care legislation would be signed into law by President Johnson. The U.S. House of Representatives would vote 333 to 85 to pass the Voting Rights Act of 1965 after the U.S. Senate had approved a similar measure.
- The release of the Tamil musical film Aayirathil Oruvan marked the end of the composing partnership between T. K. Ramamoorthy and M. S. Viswanathan.
- Pope Paul VI appointed Adolph Marx the first Roman Catholic bishop of the Roman Catholic Diocese of Brownsville, in Brownsville, Texas.
- Mass demonstrations in Guayaquil, Ecuador led to days of violent conflict with police and military.
- Born: Luis Pereyra, Argentine tango dancer and choreographer; in Santiago del Estero
- Died: L. H. Gray, 59, English physicist and inventor of the field of radiobiology, died after having a stroke. The "gray", a measure of absorbed radiation dose equivalent to one joule of radiation energy per kilogram of matter, was named in his honor by creators of the International System of Units.

== July 10, 1965 (Saturday) ==
- U.S. Secretary of the Treasury Henry H. Fowler announced a change in American monetary policy in an address at Hot Springs, Virginia, titled "A Strong, Stable Dollar". Economist John S. Odell would comment later that "Fowler's speech stunned the international financial world" in that he said that the United States was ready to participate in a world monetary conference for the purpose of reforming current arrangements to provide international liquidity; "This reversal of American policy was, in retrospect", Odell would write, "one of the most significant shifts of the last two decades. It ushered in a lengthy multilateral negotiating process" that would, in 1969, create the Special Drawing Rights on the International Monetary Fund, "creating a new synthetic international reserve asset" to rival the American dollar.
- Ten years into the First Sudanese Civil War between Muslims in the north and Christians in the south, Muslim Sudanese troops retaliated for an unsuccessful raid by the Anya Nya separatists on the Sudanese Army headquarters in Juba (now the capital of South Sudan). Over the next two days, according to official government figures from the Sudanese government in Khartoum, 1,018 civilians died after their neighborhoods were cordoned off and set on fire.
- Two F-4C Phantom II fighters of the 45th Tactical Fighter Squadron shot down two MiG-17 fighters over North Vietnam, scoring the first U.S. Air Force aerial victories of the Vietnam War.
- Born: Alexia Morales, first child of King Constantine II of Greece and his wife, Queen Anne-Marie; in Mon Repos, Corfu. Until the birth of her brother in 1967, Alexia (the niece of the future Queen Margrethe II of Denmark and the future King Juan Carlos I of Spain) would be the heir presumptive to the Greek throne. The monarchy would be abolished in 1974.
- Died: Jacques Audiberti, 66, French playwright

== July 11, 1965 (Sunday) ==
- All 52 people on board a Skyways Coach-Air (including a baby) survived its crash after the HS 748 turboprop landed heavily on a grass runway at Lympne Airport, Kent, England, dug in its nose wheel, overturned three times, broke in two and ended up upside down. Three people were hospitalized with only minor injuries. The plane was returning across the English Channel from Beauvais in France in a heavy rain, and a Ministry of Aviation official commented the next day that "it was a miracle that the aircraft did not catch fire and explode". All three of the crew and the 48 passengers were strapped in their seats and facing head down. Captain Jeff Smith and stewardess Ann Playfoot freed the passengers and rushed them through emergency exits. Playfoot would comment afterward, "When I first saw everyone with their heads hanging upside down, it could have looked so comical if it hadn't been so serious."
- President Johnson ordered the Federal Bureau of Investigation to remove all illegal wiretaps that the FBI had placed to conduct surveillance of organized crime figures, "not just shutting off the tape recorders, but physically removing every bug the special agents had installed". "[T]he removal order placed the G-men in great peril," an historian would note later, "as they once again had to surreptitiously enter the mob hangouts and pull out the sources of their hard-won intelligence."
- A group of 75 people attending a wedding in the South Sudanese city of Wau were killed by Sudanese government troops, who surrounded the cathedral where the ceremonies were taking place. After allowing four soldiers in the wedding party to leave, the troops fired on civilians as they departed.
- One year after the East African republics of Tanganyika and Zanzibar had merged to form Tanzania, the government proumulgated the new nation's first Constitution and eliminated all political parties except for the Tanganyika African National Union (TANU) and Zanzibar's Afro-Shirazi Party.
- A U.S. Air Force 551st Airborne Early Warning and Control Wing EC-121H Warning Star crashed in the Atlantic Ocean off Nantucket, Massachusetts, killing 16 of the 19-man crew. The three survivors were located after daybreak after spending hours staying afloat in chilly water wearing life jackets.
- Born: Ernesto Hoost, Dutch kickboxer and four-time world champion; in Heemskerk

== July 12, 1965 (Monday) ==
- The issuance of Circular 10/65 by the United Kingdom's Department of Education and Science transformed the state education system in England and Wales, an event that journalist Stephen Pollard listed as one of the "Ten Days that Changed the Nation". The new "Comprehensive System" replaced the "Tripartite System" of selective schools where students were tested and placed according to measurements of their abilities. After describing a resolution passed in the House of Commons of "the need to raise educational standards at all levels" and the opinion that "the realisation of this objective is impeded by the separation of children into different types of secondary schools", the Circular declared that "The Secretary of State accordingly requests local educational authorities, if they have not already done so, to prepare and submit to him plans for reorganising secondary education in their areas on comprehensive lines," although the submission of plans was not optional.
- In the Trust Territory of the Pacific Islands, the First Congress of Micronesia took place, with representatives from the Marshall Islands, the Northern Mariana Islands, Palau and the islands of Chuuk, Ponape, and Yap. The first order of business was to adopt an official flag of Micronesia. The Congress would eventually draft a constitution for the Federated States of Micronesia, although the Marshalls, the Northern Marianas and Palau would separate from the FSM to become their own independent nations.
- NASA Headquarters Gemini Program Office informed Manned Spacecraft Center that it had decided to delete extravehicular activity from Gemini missions 5, 6, and 7.
- Born: Sanjay Manjrekar, Indian international cricketer; in Mangalore, Karnataka state

== July 13, 1965 (Tuesday) ==
- A U.S. Navy sailor on the aircraft carrier USS Shangri-La accidentally jettisoned 3,000 US gallons (11,000 L; 2,500 imp gal) of bunker oil, described as "the thickest, heaviest, most molasses-like of all petroleum fuels", into the Mediterranean Sea along the a stretch of tourist beaches at the French Riviera, polluting the sand along a 3-mile (4.8 km) stretch that ran from Cannes to La Napoule in France. After "irate hotel keepers, cafe owners, and tourists" sent angry messages to commanders of the U.S. Sixth Fleet, the captain of the Shangri-La commenced a massive cleanup operation, sending hundreds of sailors to shovel the black sand into barrels and hauling it away, bringing in 2,000 pounds (910 kg) of new sand, and spraying chemicals on the sea to send the oil to the bottom. The beach was reopened at the end of the day.
- U.S. Army Sergeant First Class Isaac Camancho arrived in South Vietnam, after becoming the first American prisoner of war to successfully escape from a Viet Cong prison camp. Four days earlier, Camancho had managed to pry loose a bar on a bamboo cage where he had been kept at night, after having been captured 19 months earlier on November 24, 1963.
- The U.S. House of Representatives voted 265–103 to require a warning label on all packages of cigarettes sold in the United States on or after January 1, 1966, with the text "Caution: Cigarette smoking may be hazardous to your health." The measure had previously passed the U.S. Senate. President Johnson would sign the bill into law on July 27.
- Leonard H. Marks was named director of the United States Information Agency.

== July 14, 1965 (Wednesday) ==
- The U.S. House of Representatives voted 255–151 to eliminate silver from American quarters and dimes, and to reduce the amount of silver in the half dollar from 90 percent to 40 percent. All future 10-cent and 25-cent coins would consist of 75% copper in the middle, and 12.5% nickel for the obverse and reverse sides of the coins. The vote was split along regional lines, opposed by Congressmen from the western United States that had silver mines, and supported by those from the New England states, where manufacturers of tableware, jewelry, electronics, and photographic supplies had been affected by the increasing shortage of silver.
- The Tour de France was won by Felice Gimondi of Italy. For the first time in the Tour's history, it started in Germany. In second place, 2 minutes and 40 seconds behind Gimondi, was Raymond Poulidor of France, who would finish in second place twice, and third place five times, but would never win the Tour de France in 14 attempts.
- Australian athlete Ron Clarke broke the world record for the 10,000 meter race, becoming the first person to run the distance in less than 28 minutes and finishing the 10K at the Bislet Stadium in Oslo at 27 minutes, 39.4 seconds.
- The UK House of Commons voted 200–96 to abolish the death penalty for murder.
- The Older Americans Act was signed into law by U.S. President Johnson.
- Died:
  - Adlai Stevenson, 65, the U.S. Ambassador to the United Nations since 1961, collapsed and died of a heart attack in London after walking out of the American Embassy. Stevenson, who had lost the general election for U.S. President to Dwight Eisenhower in both 1952 and 1956, was walking with the U.S. representative to the U.N. Trusteeship Council when he was stricken at 5:15 p.m., and died in an ambulance while being rushed to a hospital.
  - Max Woosnam, 72, English tennis, soccer football, cricket, and snooker player celebrated as "The Greatest British Sportsman"
  - Spencer Williams, 75, American jazz and popular music composer, pianist, and singer

== July 15, 1965 (Thursday) ==
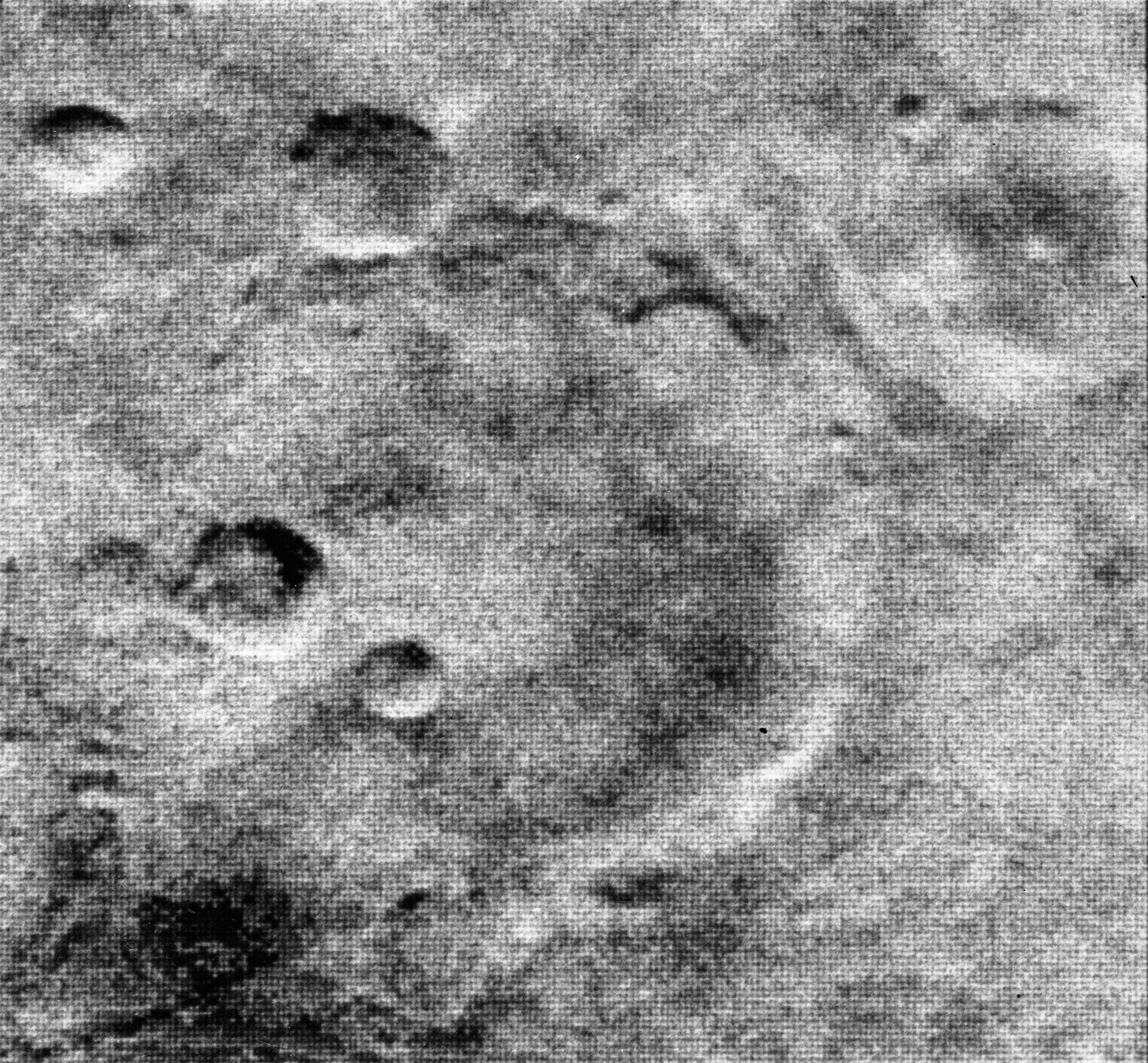
Mars from 6,118 miles

- Mariner 4 flew by Mars, and made its closest approach of 6,118 miles (9,846 km), and returning images that gave "the first look at another planetary surface, other than the vague shadings visible in telescopes". Among the revelations from its 22 pictures were that the Red Planet was covered with impact craters, demonstrating a lack of geological activity or weathering. A measurement of the changes in radio transmissions as the signals passed through the Martian atmosphere also showed that the surface pressure was 94% less than had been predicted, leading to the conclusion that it was mostly carbon dioxide and that the Martian ice caps were actually frozen CO_{2} or dry ice. The transmission of 22 pictures "was no simple matter" and relied upon film exposures being "processed internally on a convoluted series of rollers", then scanned to produce radio signals "with pulses corresponding to the light or dark areas on the negatives" at the rate of eight bits per second, which meant that each picture took eight hours to transmit.
- An unidentified flying object hovered over the airport of Canberra, capital of Australia, at an altitude of 5,000 feet (1,500 m), shortly before a tracking station at Tidninbilla was scheduled to receive signals from the Mariner 4 probe. According to an Associated Press report, six people stationed at the air traffic control tower reported that the object remained in place for 40 minutes but disappeared when a Royal Australian Air Force plane was sent to identify it. The phenomenon followed reports of sightings the previous week in England, France, and the Azores.
- Greek Prime Minister Georgios Papandreou verbally offered his resignation to King Constantine II, who promptly accepted it before it was formally submitted in writing. The resignation followed the King’s refusal to appoint Papandreou as Minister of Defense, a position Papandreou sought in order to protect his son, Andreas Papandreou, from ongoing investigations. The King also rejected Papandreou’s proposal to prohibit military officers from engaging in politics. Subsequently, the King appointed another member of the Center Union party, Georgios Athanasiadis-Novas, as prime minister. This event triggered 22 months of political instability, known as the Iouliana (July events), which ultimately culminated in the establishment of the Greek junta.
- Born: David Miliband, British Foreign Secretary from 2007 to 2010 during the ministry of Gordon Brown, and president of the International Rescue Committee; in London

== July 16, 1965 (Friday) ==
- The Mont Blanc Tunnel was inaugurated by Presidents Giuseppe Saragat of Italy and Charles de Gaulle of France. President Saragat drove from Courmayeur in Italy, traveling 7 miles (11 km) in the tunnel bored into the Alps, to Chamonix in France, where he was welcomed by President de Gaulle for ceremonies. The two men then rode together back to Italy, where further ceremonies took place. As the world's longest highway tunnel, the Mont Blanc replaced the former route, "60 miles of travel over hairpin turns on the mountain barrier".
- Three months after a commitment by China's President Liu Shaoqi to provide Chinese pilots to fight in North Vietnam, the Chinese General Staff notified North Vietnam's Defense Ministry that "the time was not appropriate" to supply the assistance. "Whatever the reasons for China's decision”, an author would note later, "the failure to satisfy Hanoi's demand must have greatly disappointed the Vietnamese since the control of the air was so crucial for the DRV's effort to protect itself from the ferocious U.S. bombing."
- The word "Powellism" was used by Iain Macleod, writing in The Spectator, to describe right-wing Tory Enoch Powell's views on economics. It would come to be used in a wider sense as Powell became a controversial figure in British politics.

== July 17, 1965 (Saturday) ==
- Representatives of West Germany's Ministry of Scientific Research and the American space agency NASA signed an agreement for joint development of the first independent German satellite project, with each side to bear its own costs.
- The second North American XB-70 Valkyrie bomber prototype made its maiden flight between Air Force Plant 42 and Edwards Air Force Base.
- Born:
  - Santiago Segura, Spanish film director; in Madrid
  - Alex Winter, American film actor; in London
- Died: Sabato "Simon" Rodia, 86, Italian-born American artist who created the Watts Towers sculpture that is now a historical landmark in Los Angeles

== July 18, 1965 (Sunday) ==
- The Soviet Union launched the Zond 3 lunar probe from an orbiting platform that had been put into space two days earlier. On July 16, the Proton 1 had set a new record for the heaviest payload (24,400 pounds (11,100 kg)) placed into an Earth orbit. Sent in part to test the Soviet Union's technology for taking and transmitting higher-resolution images than had been sent by previous Soviet vehicles, the Zond-3 would take new photographs of the far side of the Moon.
- James "Bing" Davidson, a 26-year-old bit part actor and companion of actor Paul Lynde, fell to his death from the 8th floor of the Sir Francis Drake Hotel in San Francisco, after a night of drinking and a bad decision to "do a trick" that involved hanging from the outside ledge and then pulling himself back up. As witnesses watched, Davidson tried three times to climb back into the window and hung by his fingertips before losing his grip after two minutes.
- A three-day period of extreme winter weather began in Australia. Snow was recorded as far north as the Clarke Range in Queensland, killing drought-weakened livestock. At the same time, extremely heavy rainfall in the North Coast turned drought into flood, Brisbane having its wettest-ever July day with 193.2 millimetres (7.6 in).
- The first All-Africa Games opened in Brazzaville, Republic of the Congo. The next day, Ahmed Djelli of Algeria won the first gold medal of the games, winning a 142-kilometre (88 mi) race from Brazzaville to Kinkala. Future Olympic medalist Kip Keino of Kenya won the 1,500 meter race on July 22.

== July 19, 1965 (Monday) ==
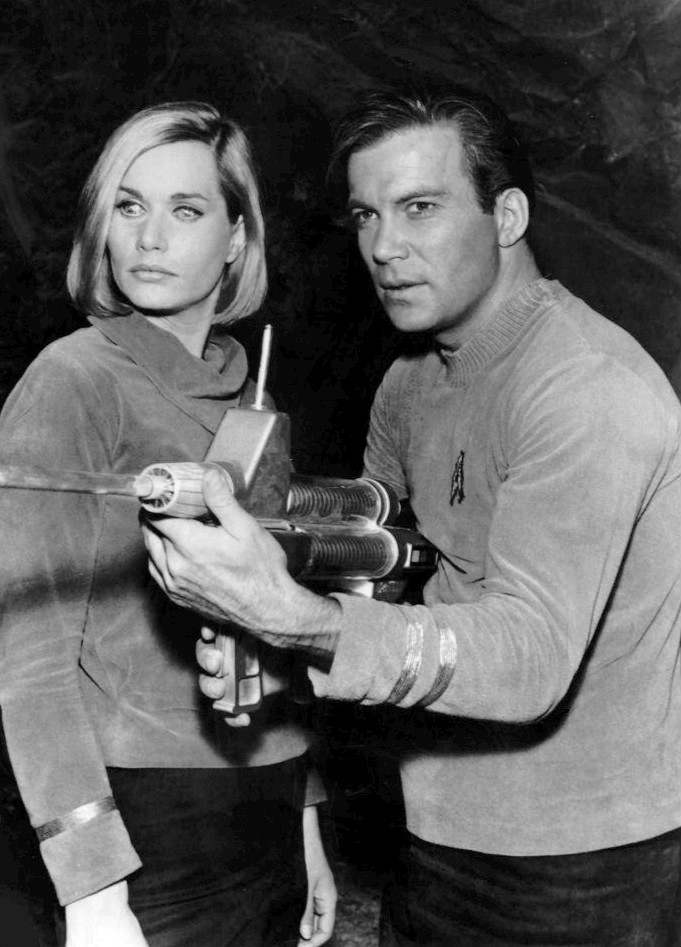
Sally Kellerman and William Shatner in "Where No Man Has Gone Before"

- Filming began on the second television pilot for Gene Roddenberry's proposed science fiction series, Star Trek, with only one member of the cast from the first pilot. "Where No Man Has Gone Before" retained actor Leonard Nimoy as "Mr. Spock", who had played the same role in the first pilot, "The Cage", but now featured Canadian actor William Shatner in the lead role as the starship's captain.
- Soviet Premier Alexei Kosygin addressed an audience at Riga on the 25th anniversary of the 1940 "liberation" of an independent Latvia and its annexation by the Soviet Union, and surprised his audience by acknowledging the problem of prejudice against the Jewish people. "Nationalism, Great Power chauvinism, racism and anti-Semitism", he noted, "are completely alien to our society... and our mirovozzrenie", a reference to the Soviet overall view of the world.
- The U.S. Army Special Forces camp at Bu Dop, about 100 miles (160 km) north of Saigon, came under attack by the Viet Cong during the Vietnam War. Air strikes by two F-100s of the 481st Tactical Fighter Squadron were credited with "probably saving the camp that night".
- The West African nation of Ghana abandoned the Ghanaian pound that it had used since independence, and issued its new decimal currency. Replacing the pound worth 20 shillings or 120 pence was the cedi, worth 100 pesewas.
- Born: Evelyn Glennie, Scottish percussionist; in Aberdeenshire
- Died:
  - Syngman Rhee, 90, the first President of South Korea, from 1948 to 1960, died in exile in a hospital in Honolulu in the U.S.
  - Clyde Beatty, 62, American circus performer and owner, died of cancer.
  - Ingrid Jonker, 32, South African poet, committed suicide by walking into Three Anchor Bay at Cape Town and drowning herself.

== July 20, 1965 (Tuesday) ==
- Li Zongren (Li Tsung-jen), who had served as the acting President of the Republic of China during 1949 before it fell to the Communists later in the year, returned to Beijing after nearly 16 years of self-imposed exile in the United States. General Li pledged support to the People's Republic of China and said that he was making up for his "guilty past", and was welcomed by Prime Minister Zhou Enlai. Li, who would urge other former officials to return home from Taiwan, had sold his home in New York until June, then traveled to Zürich and spent a month there before flying back to Mainland China.
- Police in Saigon foiled a plot to assassinate outgoing U.S. Ambassador to South Vietnam Maxwell D. Taylor, 15 minutes before he was scheduled to enter a stadium for South Vietnam's "National Unity Day for the Liberation of North Viet Nam" rally. Viet Cong members had placed a shrapnel-loaded bomb at a cemetery across the street from the entrance that Taylor was to use. A similar-sized bomb had killed 43 people at the My Canh restaurant on June 25.
- Arthur J. Goldberg resigned from his lifetime appointment as a Justice of the United States Supreme Court to accept the nomination as the new U.S. Ambassador to the United Nations, filling the vacancy created by the death of Adlai Stevenson.
- Columbia Records released rock musician Bob Dylan's influential single "Like a Rolling Stone" in the United States.

== July 21, 1965 (Wednesday) ==
- President Johnson convened his advisers in a meeting of the 15-member National Security Council at the White House, prior to making a decision about the direction that the United States should take in fighting the Vietnam War. During the morning session, George Ball, the United States Under Secretary of State, strongly argued against the recommendation by Secretary of Defense Robert S. McNamara to increase the number of American troops in South Vietnam. Before adjourning at 1:00, the President gave Ball 90 minutes to prepare a last-ditch attempt to stop the war from escalating. According to minutes of that day's meeting that would be released years later, Ball urged that the U.S. should "cut its losses" and allow the South Vietnamese government to "do what seems natural to it, let it fall apart" and, with the rest of the advisers against him, closed with the prophetic statement that South Vietnam would ultimately lose to the Viet Cong guerrillas, regardless of McNamara's plans to commit 175,000 additional troops, that the U.S. would not get out with a victory, and that "we'll double our bet and get lost in the rice paddies."
- The National Congress of Fiji called a meeting of Fijian and European members of the Legislative Council, with the eventual intention of forming a new political party under Kamisese Mara.
- Born: Guðni Bergsson, Icelandic footballer; in Reykjavík

== July 22, 1965 (Thursday) ==
- Sir Alec Douglas-Home suddenly resigned as a head of the British Conservative Party. Home, a former prime minister, did not give a reason for his resignation other than to say that his successor should have the chance to consolidate the party before the next parliamentary elections. Opinion polls had shown a drop in approval of the Conservative Party prior to Home's departure; MP Reggie Maudling would say later that, "As usually happens in the Conservative Party, the old rules of public life applied, namely that there is no gratitude in politics, and you should never kick a man until he is down."
- Canada Post letter carriers in Montreal walked off the job, touching off a series of strikes across Canada. Members of the Postal Workers' Brotherhood in Vancouver went on strike later in the day, and Toronto members of the Federated Association of Letter Carriers followed the next day.
- Born: Shawn Michaels (ring name for Michael Shawn Hickenbottom), American professional wrestler; in Chandler, Arizona

== July 23, 1965 (Friday) ==
- President Johnson signed the U.S. Coinage Act of 1965 into law, reducing silver content in half dollars from 90% to 40%, and eliminating silver from dimes and quarters.
- The City of London Corporation announced that the famous London Bridge over the Thames River, last rebuilt in 1831, was cracking and gradually sinking, and that the span would be replaced by a new concrete structure.
- A few minutes after Allegheny Airlines Flight 604 took off from Williamsport, Pennsylvania, United States, the plane's left engine caught fire. Unable to return to the airport, the pilot, Captain Allan J. Lauber guided the Convair to a crash landing near the small township of Loyalsock. As it was being guided to an open field, the plane hit power lines, narrowly missing a barn and the Good Shepherd Episcopal Church. Thirty-three of the forty people on board, including Lauber, were hospitalized, none in critical condition.
- Pope Paul VI established the Roman Catholic Diocese of Los Teques.
- Israel's Mapai Party expelled its longtime leader, David Ben-Gurion.
- The 1965 World Archery Championships concluded in Sweden.
- Born: Slash (stage name for Saul Hudson), British-born rock guitarist for Guns N' Roses; in Hampstead, London

== July 24, 1965 (Saturday) ==
- American pilots encountered surface-to-air missiles (SAMs) for the first time in the Vietnam War, as an F-4 Phantom II jet and its crew of two USAF officers was shot down by a Soviet-made S-75 Dvina (referred to in the West as the SA-2 Guideline missile). The F-4 was one of four that were struck while escorting a bombing raid at Kang Chi, 40 miles (64 km) northwest of Hanoi. Captain Roscoe Henry Fobair was killed, while the other officer, Captain Richard Paul Keirn, survived and would remain a prisoner of war for seven years and seven months. Captain Keirn had been a POW during World War II, and became one of only two Americans to be captured as a prisoner in two wars. Captain Keirn was also the first pilot in the war to be shot down by a surface-to-air missile, when his F-4 Phantom was struck on 24 July 1965. Overall, less than two percent of the 9,000 SAMs fired would actually strike U.S. planes during the war; of the 3,000 American planes shot down, 85% were taken out by antiaircraft guns, 8% by missiles, and 7% by enemy aircraft.
- With members of the Turkish Cypriot community boycotting the legislature, the House of Representatives in Cyprus voted unanimously to re-elect Archbishop Makarios III as president to an additional five-year term, and to extend their own terms through 1970 as well, without conducting elections. Under the constitution, the Greek Cypriot legislators had a 70% majority even before the Turkish Cypriot members began avoiding Parliament in 1963.
- Geophysicist J. Tuzo Wilson announced a major discovery in plate tectonics with the publication in the journal Nature of his paper, "A New Class of Faults and Their Bearing on Continental Drift", describing the "transform fault", a boundary between tectonic plates characterized by a horizontal motion.
- The Detroit Triple Fan Fair (DTFF) held its first convention at the Embassy Hotel in Detroit, Michigan. It is considered to be one of the first comic book conventions in the United States and would run annually until 1977.
- Died:
  - Loucye Gordy Wakefield, 41, American music executive who operated the music publishing division of Motown Records
  - Irene Browne, 69, British stage and film actress
  - Constance Bennett, 60, American film actress

== July 25, 1965 (Sunday) ==
- Tunku Abdul Rahman, the Prime Minister of Malaysia, made the decision that Singapore should leave the Federation of Malaysia and become its own separate nation, and informed the leaders of Singapore's People's Action Party of his choice. The other alternative that he had considered was to impose federation rule upon the area in order to control unrest among Singapore's predominantly Chinese residents, and the Malay people in the rest of the federation. On August 9, the separation of Singapore from Malaysia would be announced.
- Bob Dylan upset many of his fans at the Newport Folk Festival purists by "going electric" in a live performance, but opened the era of folk rock, with the themes of folk music accompanied by the electric guitar. An author who was present at the festival would write later that it was a myth that Dylan had been booed as he played. After his three-song set, Dylan returned to the stage later in the show and played "It's All Over Now, Baby Blue" on an acoustic guitar.
- Ma'rib, the last area in eastern Yemen to support the Yemen Arab Republic that had toppled the King of Yemen in 1962, fell to Royalist forces led by the former King's brother, Prince Abdullah al-Badr. An author would later write that the fall of Ma'rib meant that "it was possible to travel from the Federation to Saudi Arabia across territory held by Royalist forces or tribes loyal to the Imam for the first time since the outbreak of the conflict."
- Américo Tomás was re-elected to a second seven-year term as President of Portugal, as the only candidate under consideration by the 585-member electoral college. Sixteen of the members refused to cast a ballot in protest over the indirect suffrage system used to select a chief executive. Tomás had few powers in the European nation, which had been controlled by Prime Minister António de Oliveira Salazar for 33 years.
- Casey Stengel, the 74-year-old manager of the New York Mets baseball team, broke his hip the day after coaching the team in a 5–1 loss to the Philadelphia Phillies. Stengel, who had announced that he would be retiring from the game at the end of the 1965 season, chose pitching coach Wes Westrum as his replacement and would retire a month earlier than originally planned.
- Martin Luther King Jr. addressed a crowd of over 8,000 in Winnetka, Illinois, after several other speeches in Chicago that day. Addressing the issue of discrimination in housing, he told the mostly white crowd that "we must now come together as brothers or perish as fools."
- Died: Freddie Mills, 46, English boxer who was the world light heavyweight champion from 1948 to 1950, died of a self-inflicted gunshot wound. Mills was dead on arrival at Middlesex Hospital after police found him in his car in an alley near his nightclub, the Freddie Mills Nite Spot, on Charing Cross Road in London. An inquest would later rule that he had committed suicide.

== July 26, 1965 (Monday) ==
- The Maldives, a set of inhabited islands in the Indian Ocean, were granted full independence from the United Kingdom in a ceremony held at the residence of the British High Commissioner in Colombo, Sri Lanka. Muhammad Fareed Didi continued as Sultan of the constitutional monarchy, and Ibrahim Nasir Rannabandeyri Kilegefan (who would become the nation's first president in 1968) served as the first prime minister.
- Mario Savio, the 22-year-old leader of the Free Speech Movement at the University of California, Berkeley, was sentenced to 120 days in jail for his part in leading the sit-in at the administration building in December. Savio's sentence, the longest meted out by Berkeley Municipal Judge Rupert Crittenden, came after he rejected an offer of probation conditioned on not taking part in future protest demonstrations.
- The Free Papua Movement (Organisasi Papua Merdeka or OPM), seeking the independence of the West Papua region from Indonesia, made its first attack on the Indonesian Army, as forestry workers struck during a flag raising ceremony in Manokwari.
- Born:
  - Jeremy Piven, American television actor (Entourage); in New York City
  - Vladimir Cruz, Cuban film actor and director; in Villa Clara

== July 27, 1965 (Tuesday) ==
- Edward Heath was elected the new leader of the United Kingdom's Conservative Party as 298 of the 303 Tory members of the House of Commons voted in "a narrow oakpaneled corridor of parliament". The result was announced at 2:17 "without a single hurrah from anyone's supporter", with Heath receiving 150, Reggie Maudling 133, and Enoch Powell 15. Although the party's bylaws required a runoff if no candidate received two-thirds of the vote, Maudling acknowledged that "Mr. Heath has attained an over-all majority on the first ballot," and declined to participate in a second vote between the top two finishers.
- American aircraft destroyed a surface-to-air missile installation for the first time, attacking an SA-2 Guideline site in North Vietnam. Operation Spring High took off with 46 Republic F-105 Thunderchief fighter-bombers and 58 other supporting aircraft to bomb the sites, losing six planes in the process and destroying only one of the two targets, designated as "site 6". Afterward, "bomb damage assessment photos disclosed that there was a dummy missile in site 6, placed there as a trap, and that site 7 was empty."
- The first successful reattachment of a completely amputated thumb was performed by two Japanese surgeons, Dr. Shigeo Komatsu and Dr. Susumu Tamai, at the Nara Medical University in Kashihara. The patient was a 28-year-old male whose thumb had been severed in a work accident, and the surgeons built upon microvascular surgical anastomosis techniques in reconnecting blood vessels as small as 1 millimetre (0.039 in) in diameter.
- Queen Elizabeth II became the first British monarch to ride on the hovercraft, until the ship's engine broke down. She and Prince Philip were ferried ashore while repairs were made.
- Born:
  - The Lawson quintuplets (Sam, Selina, Shirlene, Lisa, and Deborah Lawson), the first quintuplets to be conceived following the use of fertility medication and the first to be born in New Zealand; in Auckland. The five children were all descendants of Fletcher Christian, who had led the mutiny on the ship HMS Bounty in 1789. Their mother, former beauty queen Ann Lawson, would be murdered by her second husband in 1982.
  - Trifon Ivanov, defender for Bulgaria's national soccer football team (d. 2016); in Veliko Tarnovo
  - José Luis Chilavert, goalkeeper for Paraguay's national soccer football team; in Luque

== July 28, 1965 (Wednesday) ==
- In a nationally televised speech, U.S. President Johnson announced his decision to send an additional 50,000 American troops to South Vietnam, increasing the number of personnel there by two-thirds and to bring the commitment to 125,000. Johnson also said that the monthly draft call would more than double, to more than 1,000 new young men per day (from 17,000 to 35,000) for enlistment and training in the U.S. Armed Forces. Johnson timed the speech for the noon hour in Washington, D.C., when there were fewer television viewers. As one historian would later note, "At 12:33 p.m. on July 28, 1965— without going before Congress, without a prime-time address to the nation— President Lyndon Johnson committed the United States to a land war in Southeast Asia."
- Abe Fortas, described as one of the closest personal friends of President Johnson, was nominated to become the new associate justice of the United States Supreme Court, to replace Arthur Goldberg. Fortas would resign from the Supreme Court in 1969 after being implicated in a scandal.
- The U.S. Senate voted, 70–24, to ratify the Medicare bill for President Johnson's signature. The House of Representatives had approved the compromise the day before, 307–116.
- Pierre Harmel became the new Prime Minister of Belgium, and would serve as the head of government for eight months.
- Died: Edogawa Ranpo, 70, Japanese mystery novelist

== July 29, 1965 (Thursday) ==
- The governments of Algeria and France signed an agreement which allowed French petroleum companies to retain their concessions for the right to drill for oil in Algeria, but required also that they cooperate with Algeria's government-owned oil and gas consortium, Société Nationale pour la Recherche, la Production, le Transport, la Transformation, et la Commercialisation des Hydrocarbures (Sonatrach).
- The first 4,000 101st Airborne Division paratroopers arrived in Vietnam, landing at Cam Ranh Bay.
- Born: Chang-Rae Lee, Korean-born American novelist

== July 30, 1965 (Friday) ==
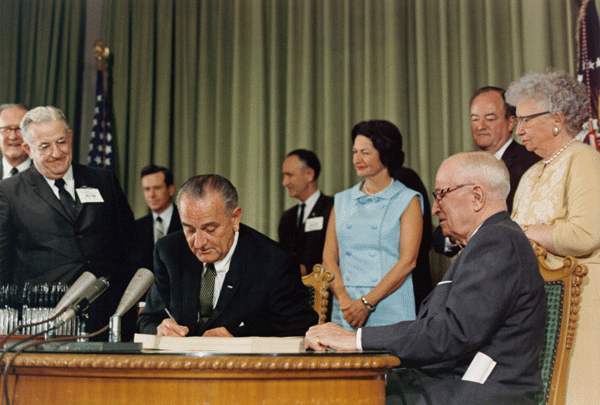
President Johnson and former President Truman

- In a ceremony at the Truman Presidential Library in Independence, Missouri, President Johnson signed the Social Security Act of 1965 into law, establishing Medicare and Medicaid. As president, Harry S. Truman had first proposed nationwide health care for the elderly, but had failed to gain passage of a bill. "I'm glad to have lived this long," Truman said in a speech introducing Johnson, then told the new president, "Your inspired leadership and an understanding Congress have brought this about."
- The Spacecraft Organization of Lockheed-California Company delivered the final report on a modular multipurpose space station to Manned Spacecraft Center. The concept provided for a sequential evolution of space vehicles ranging from small Apollo-dependent laboratories, through larger, more versatile laboratories, to a semipermanent space station. Initial objectives of the study were to refine and optimize the design of the large orbital research laboratory.
- Died: Jun'ichirō Tanizaki, 79, Japanese novelist

== July 31, 1965 (Saturday) ==
- Canada's nationwide postal workers' strike came to an end after letter carriers returned to work across the nation, with the exception of the city of Montreal, where the first walkout had started. The 4,100 workers in and around Montreal would return to work on August 9.
- With a nationwide ban going into effect on August 1, the very last cigarette commercial on British television was broadcast. The final telly ad was for Rothmans cigarettes.
- Born: J. K. Rowling, British novelist who created the best-selling Harry Potter book series; as Joanne Rowling in Yate, Gloucestershire
- Died: André Godard, 84, French archaeologist and architect
