= 76.5 FM =

FM radio frequency

The following radio stations broadcast on FM frequency 76.5 MHz:

== Japan ==
- JOAW-FM at Osaka
- InterFM at Yokohama
- Dreams FM at Kurume
