= Gunamudian David Boaz =

Indian psychologist (1908–1965)

G. D. Boaz
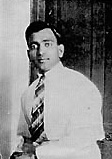
- Boaz as a young man in London
- Born: 31 March 1908; Palliyadi, South Travancore (Travancore Kingdom), Present-day Tamil Nadu
- Died: 8 July 1965 (aged 57); Madras, India
- Education: Scott Christian College; The University of Oxford

Gunamudian David Boaz (31 March 1908 – 8 July 1965) was the first Indian psychologist. He received his PhD from The University of Oxford in 1935, and graduated from Scott Christian College. The department of Psychology was instituted at the University of Madras in 1943 by him under the influence of Nobel laureate, Sir C. V. Raman and G.N. Ramachandran. The "Journal of The Madras University" states that Boaz joined the department on 27 September 1943 and on 27 October 1943, he became the Senior Lecturer in Psychology. In 1948, a full-fledged Psychology department was organized under the headship of Boaz. The department concentrated exclusively on children and their education first. He was credited for making India a major contributor in the field on Psychology. Later on in 1976, the department turned its attention to Criminology, Applied Psychology, Organizational Psychology and Counseling, etc. The Indian Government has instituted an award in remembrance of his Work, and more over the Tamil Nadu Government Psychiatric rehabilitation is named after him, The Dr. G.D. Boaz Memorial Hospital His paternal cousin is Dr. A.S. Johnson. The family with over two hundred years of recorded history has been one of the oldest leading noble families of South Travancore and Kanniyakumari District.

== Publications ==
- New Statesman and Nation, a speech written 19 September 1942
- Know Your Mind, a collection of articles published in The Hindu from 1948 to 1965
- Reactions of Socially Backward Groups to Various Ameliorative Measures (1956, University of Madras)
- Elements of Psychology (1956, S. Vishwanathan, Chetpet, Madras)
- General Psychology (1957, Boaz Institute of Psychological Service)
- The Step-child — Step-mother Relationship — A Clinical Study from Journal of Psychological Researches (January 1958 v.2 no.1, Madras Psychology Society)
- Educational Psychology (1958, Arooran Printers, Chennai)
- Some Fundamentals of Psychology (1958)
- Papers on Industrial Psychology: A Symposium (1962, University Publishers)]
- Indian Journal of Applied Psychology (editor) (1964, University of Madras Psychology Department)
- The Concept of Mind By G. D. Boaz, C. Burt, Hans J. Eysenck, Hebb, G. D. Boring (1972, Lawrence Verry Incorporated)
- Principles of Psychology (date needed)

== Personal life ==
Gunamudian married Daisy Navaratnamalar Tucker. He had 5 children: 4 sons and 1 daughter. His first son Prabhakaran David Boaz (1935–2012) started the G D Boaz Memorial Hospital School in his memory. It is a rehabilitation centre and hospice for the mentally disabled. He also founded the Boaz Public School (Gowrivakkam) in 1993, which celebrated its Silver Jubilee year in 2019–2020. His daughter, Bharathi Paul (1937–), is a renowned gospel singer and has recorded many albums (His Master's Voice ). Bharathi is also the first woman to drive a car in the roads of Chennai. His third child is Premakaran Boaz (1940–). He retired from Ford Motors and has more than 30 patented inventions to his credit. Th fourth child, Padmakaran (Mohan) Boaz (1944–2006), worked for the Police Department in Houston and was a talented musician. Rasikaran Boaz (1946–), the youngest child, retired as a Financial Consultant and resides in Miami, Florida.
