= August 1965 =

Month of 1965

| << | August 1965 | | | | | >> |
| Su | Mo | Tu | We | Th | Fr | Sa |
| 1 | 2 | 3 | 4 | 5 | 6 | 7 |
| 8 | 9 | 10 | 11 | 12 | 13 | 14 |
| 15 | 16 | 17 | 18 | 19 | 20 | 21 |
| 22 | 23 | 24 | 25 | 26 | 27 | 28 |
| 29 | 30 | 31 |

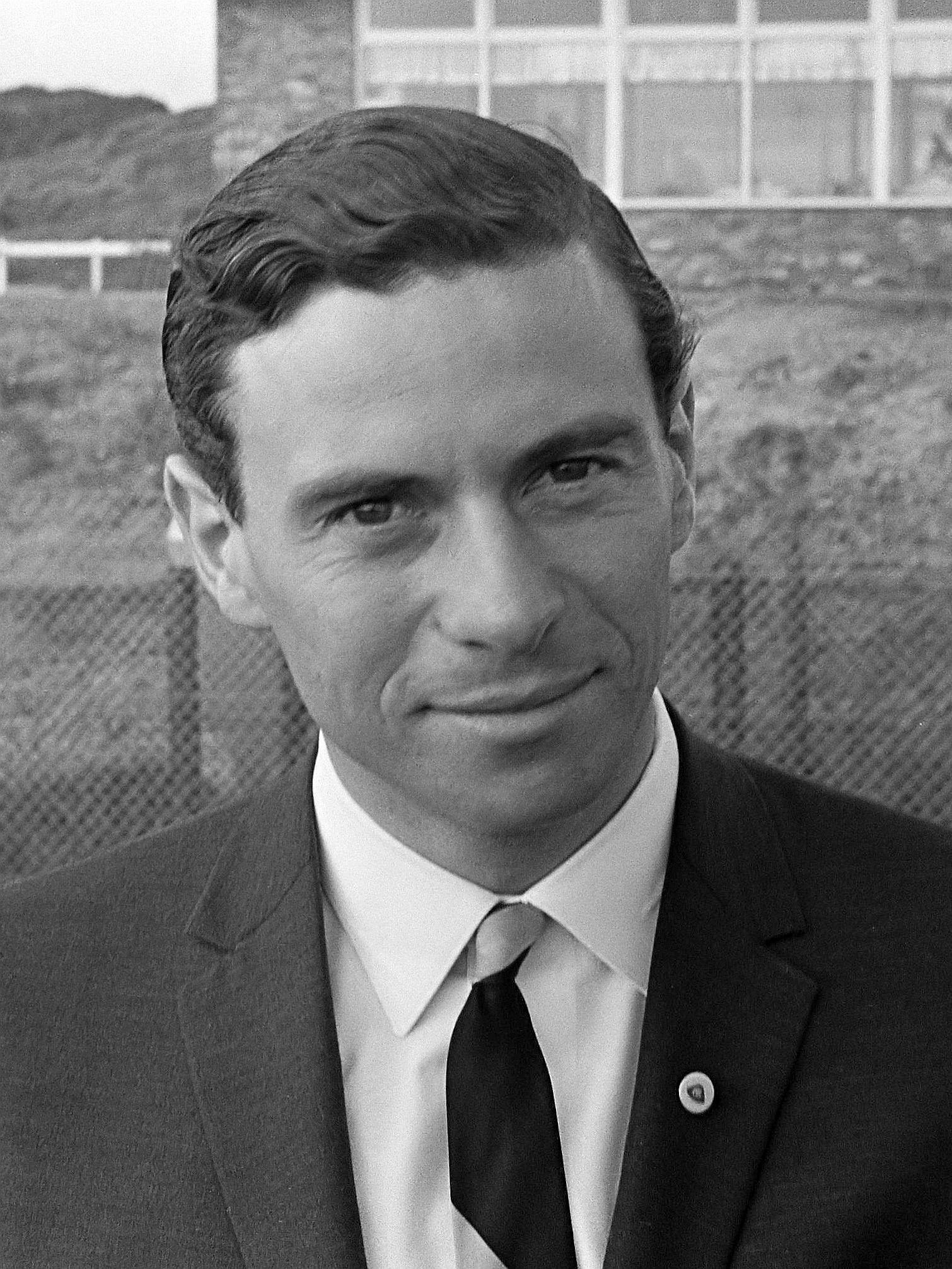
August 1, 1965: Scottish driver Jim Clark wins the Formula One championship

August 9, 1965: Republic of Singapore created after separation from Malaysia...

... with Malaysian Parliament voting 126 to 0 in favor of expelling Singapore

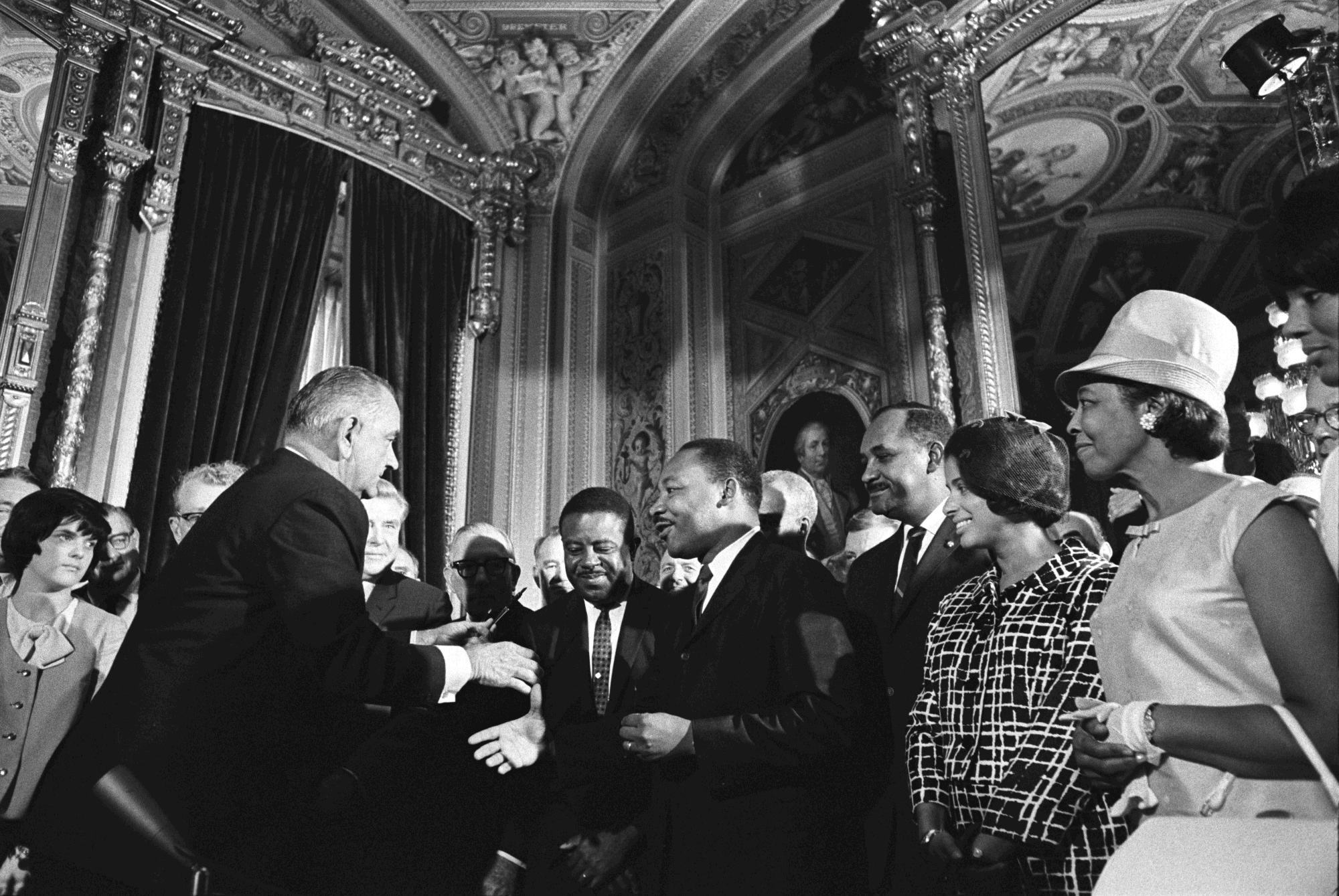
August 6, 1965: Voting Rights Act signed into law by U.S. President Johnson

The following events occurred in August 1965:

== August 1, 1965 (Sunday) ==
- General Lo Jui-ching, the Chief of Joint Staff of the armed forces of the People's Republic of China, declared on Radio Peking that the Chinese were ready to fight the United States again, as they had in the Korean War. Comparing U.S. President Lyndon Johnson to Adolf Hitler, Benito Mussolini and Hideki Tojo, General Lo said of the Americans that "If they lose all sense of reality in their lust for gain and persist in underestimating the strength and determination of the Chinese people, impose a war on us, and compel us to accept the challenge, the Chinese people and the Chinese People's Liberation Army, long well prepared and standing in battle array, not only will stay with you without fail to the end, but invite you to come in large numbers, the more the better.
- Jim Clark of Scotland clinched the 1965 Formula One racing championship by winning the German Grand Prix at Adenau, outside of Nürburgring. It was Clark's sixth victory in all six of his starts in the 1965 season.
- Cigarette advertising became illegal on British television. Still, the number of British cigarette smokers continued to increase until the mid-1970s.
- Born: Sam Mendes, English film director who won an Academy Award for American Beauty and a Golden Globe for Road to Perdition; in Reading, Berkshire

== August 2, 1965 (Monday) ==
- The Japanese tanker Meiko Maru collided with the American freighter ship Arizona in the Pacific Ocean, 100 nautical miles (190 km) south of Tokyo and sank along with 18 of her crew of 22. The Meiku Maru weighed 995 tons, and the Arizona, whose crew of 57 was unhurt, weighed more than 12 times as much at 12,711 tons.
- Britain's new Leader of the Opposition, Ted Heath, moved to censure the government of Prime Minister Harold Wilson. The motion, a vote of confidence on Wilson's government, failed, 290–303.
- Born:
  - Sandra Ng, Chinese film and television actress; as Ng Kwan-yu in British Hong Kong
  - Hisanobu Watanabe, Japanese baseball pitcher and manager; in Kiryū
- Died: František Langer, 77, Czech dramatist, physician, screenwriter, and literary critic

== August 3, 1965 (Tuesday) ==
- After coming under attack by Viet Cong sniper fire, U.S. Marines burned down the South Vietnamese village of Cam Ne, "using flame throwers, cigarette lighters and bulldozers" to set fire to 150 houses made up of straw, thatch, and bamboo, and bulldozing homes made of sturdier materials. Major General Lewis W. Walt, the commander of the 3rd Marine Division, said in a statement that "the civilians had been urged in advance by helicopter loudspeakers to go to open fields where they would be safe" before their homes were burned down. The Marines were accompanied by CBS reporter Morley Safer and a cameraman, and while the newspaper reports of the deliberate destruction of homes had little impact, American TV viewers were shocked when they saw film of the attack on the CBS Evening News, and U.S. President Lyndon Johnson was infuriated by the CBS decision to show the Vietnam War in an unfavorable light.
- Rex Heflin, a highway inspector working in the area of Santa Ana, California, photographed a UFO. His four Polaroid photos, distinguishable from previous purported pictures of such objects, would come to be considered among the most reliable evidence of the existence of UFOs because the photographs in a Polaroid 101 camera developed inside the camera within one minute after being taken. Earlier in the week, police in central Oklahoma and southwestern New Mexico received multiple calls from witnesses who had seen "objects flying very high and changing from red to white to blue-green, in diamond-shaped formations" in Chickasha, Shawnee, Cushing, and Chandler, Oklahoma; and Hobbs, New Mexico, Carlsbad, New Mexico, and Artesia, New Mexico.
- Born: Mark "Spike" Stent, English record producer and mixing engineer who has worked with many international artists since 1985; in Alton, Hampshire

== August 4, 1965 (Wednesday) ==
- The U.S. Senate voted, 79 to 18, to pass the Voting Rights Act of 1965. The day before, the measure had passed the U.S. House of Representatives, 328 to 74, and, hours later, passed the U.S. Senate.
- The Cook Islands officially became self-governing, with Albert Henry as their first prime minister.
- Born:
  - Fredrik Reinfeldt, Prime Minister of Sweden from 2006 to 2014; in Stockholm
  - Dennis Lehane, American mystery novelist; in Boston

== August 5, 1965 (Thursday) ==
- The Indo-Pakistani War of 1965, also referred to as the "Second Kashmir War", began as Pakistan commenced Operation Gibraltar when as many as 10,000 armed infiltrators crossed into India and the state of Jammu and Kashmir, disguised as civilians. India and Pakistan had fought over the area after both became independent in 1947, and had divided the area along a ceasefire line on January 1, 1949, with Pakistan organizing the area west of the line as Azad Kashmir. Sixty companies of the Pakistani armed services came across the line with instructions for targets to attack, and several were captured that day. Within the first three weeks of fighting, 412 Pakistani servicemen and 150 Indian soldiers would be killed in combat. The war would last five months, until January 4, 1966, when the two nations agreed to withdraw their troops back to their respective sides of the 1949 line.
- Fifteen members of a film crew were injured in an accident during the filming of the movie Easy Come, Easy Go, including the lead actor, Jan Berry of the rock duo Jan and Dean, and the director, Barry Shear. Background scenes were being filmed aboard a flatcar at a railroad yard in the Chatsworth section of northwestern Los Angeles, when a train crashed into the car from behind. Berry (who would be injured in a car wreck in April 1966) sustained a compound fracture of his left leg, while Shear suffered internal injuries. Paramount Pictures would abandon the project and recycle the title two years later for an unrelated story starring rock singer Elvis Presley.
- Only 21 days after becoming Prime Minister of Greece, the unpopular Georgios Athanasiadis-Novas was voted out of office by a vote of 167 to 131 in the Hellenic Parliament. King Constantine II had appointed Athanasiadis-Novas on July 15 after dismissing his predecessor, Georgios Papandreou. Papandreou demanded and received a face-to-face meeting with the King and told reporters later that he had asked the king to reappoint him as the Premier, or to call new elections.
- Future U.S. President Gerald R. Ford, a Congressman from Michigan and the leader of the Republican minority in the House of Representatives, urged President Johnson to ask Congress to declare war on North Vietnam, so that the increasing commitment of American servicemen could be debated. "It would be the honest thing to do under the circumstances, considering our present commitment."
- After reviewing the photographs of Mars transmitted by the Mariner 4 space probe, NASA's chief reviewer, Dr. Robert B. Leighton, announced that there was no life on Mars, and it was unlikely that there ever had been. "There never has been an ocean on Mars," Dr. Leighton said in a press conference, "which makes it less hopeful that life could have started there spontaneously."
- Sir Gerald Lathbury succeeded Sir Alfred Dudley Ward as Governor of Gibraltar.

== August 6, 1965 (Friday) ==
- President Lyndon Johnson signed the Voting Rights Act of 1965 into law after speaking in the rotunda of the United States Capitol. Johnson then went over to the Senate Chamber for the first time since becoming president, reportedly "used about 100 pens" to sign the document, and announced that the first lawsuits under the new Act would be filed the next afternoon at 1:00. The law, initially set to expire after five years, eliminated literacy tests and other provisions that had been used to disqualify African-Americans from voting, and would dramatically increase the number of registered black American voters. By 1969, 60 percent of eligible blacks in southern states would be registered to vote; in Mississippi, the number of black voters would increase eight-fold between 1964 (7%) and 1968 (59%).
- On the 20th anniversary of the atomic bombing of Hiroshima, a crowd of 30,000 people gathered at the Peace Memorial Park, where Mayor Shinzo Hamai added 469 additional names to the list of identified victims of the blast, including 69 who had died in the past year from radiation-related cancers. The other 400 people had been killed when the bomb detonated on August 6, 1945, and remained unidentified for more than 19 years.
- Retaliating for an attack on one of its patrol craft in April by gunboats from the People's Republic of China, the Navy of Taiwan sent two of its ships, the Jianmen and the smaller Zhangjiang, across the Taiwan Strait to stage a landing on the coastline of Guangdong province near Shantou. The People's Liberation Army Navy dispatched four of its own gunboats and after a three-hour battle, both of the Taiwanese ships were sunk.
- Help!, the fifth studio album by The Beatles and the soundtrack to their film of the same name was released in the UK by Parlophone Records. Seven of the fourteen songs, including the singles "Help!" and "Ticket to Ride", appeared in the film and take up the first side of the vinyl album. The second side includes "Yesterday", the most-covered song ever written.
- The Soviet Union's Zond 2 space probe passed within 1,500 kilometres (930 miles) of the planet Mars, closer than the American Mariner 4 approach on July 15. Unfortunately, the Zond probe had stopped transmitting on May 2, so none of the images it had taken were received on Earth.
- After its pilots bailed out safely following gunfire, a B-57 bomber and its payload of 16 armed 250-pound (110 kg) bombs crashed in a residential area of the South Vietnamese city of Nha Trang, killing at least 12 people and injuring 75 others.
- NASA's Associate Administrator for Manned Space Flight George E. Mueller announced the creation of the Saturn/Apollo Applications (SAA) Office, with responsibility for both the Saturn IB Centaur program and the Apollo Extension System (AES) effort, with David M. Jones as the acting director.
- Born:
  - Mark Speight, English TV host of the children's art programme SMart; in Seisdon, Staffordshire (committed suicide by hanging, 2008)
  - David Robinson, U.S. Navy officer and NBA all-star, inductee in the Basketball Hall of Fame; in Key West, Florida
  - Ravi Coltrane, American jazz saxophonist; in Long Island, New York, to saxophonist John Coltrane
  - Yuki Kajiura, Japanese composer, arranger and music producer; in Tokyo
  - Chin Ka-lok, Chinese action movie actor and TV host; in Hong Kong
- Died:
  - Nancy Carroll, 61, American stage and film actress, was found dead in her apartment after failing to show up for the final performance of the play Never Too Late at the Tappan Zee playhouse in Nyack, New York, where she co-starred with Bert Lahr.
  - Everett Sloane, 55, American character actor on radio, stage, film, and television, was found dead in his home after taking an overdose of barbiturates, apparently in despair over his failing eyesight.

== August 7, 1965 (Saturday) ==
- Two Russian citizens of the Soviet Union, Pyotr Kalitenko and Grigoriy Sarapushkin, came ashore at Wales, Alaska, after their walrus-skin boat drifted 70 miles (110 km) across the Bering Strait. The two men had set out two days earlier from Lavrentiya in Siberia, where both worked at a smelter, on a mushroom hunting trip. After getting lost in a fog, they found that they had reached the United States, and asked for political asylum. Both would eventually change their minds and ask to return to the USSR, with Sarapushkin leaving on November 30, and Kalitenko departing on September 19, 1966, after briefly working in Detroit.
- The Singapore Agreement was signed by Tunku Abdul Rahman, the Prime Minister of Malaysia, and Lee Kuan Yew, who had continued to lead Singapore since its merger with Malaya and other nations to create the Federation of Malaysia. The parties agreed that "Singapore shall cease to be a State of Malaysia on the 9th day of August 1965... and shall become an independent and sovereign State separate from and independent of Malaysia."
- A planned concert by The Beatles in Vienna, Austria, was canceled by the organizers, the Jeunesses Musicale, which had sponsored the concerts in hopes of earning enough money to sponsor classical music programs. The event had been set for October 24, 25 and 26, but few tickets had been sold less than four months before showtime and the media showed no interest.

== August 8, 1965 (Sunday) ==
- NBC Sports made its first telecast under its five-year national television contract that had ensured the survival of the American Football League in its competition with the National Football League. The opening event was a preseason game between the Buffalo Bills and the Boston Patriots, which Buffalo won, 23–0. Since the NFL had not started its preseason, CBS Sports countered the NBC broadcast by showing the Baltimore Colts' "Blue-White Game", the annual scrimmage between two squads of the Colts team.
- Three days after Pakistan began Operation Gibraltar, four men who had been the first four Pakistani volunteers to be captured on India's side of Kashmir ceasefire line were interviewed on All India Radio and publicly described Pakistan's secret plan for infiltration.
- Refusing to restore Giorgios Papandreou as the Premier of Greece, King Constantine instead appointed Papandreou's deputy premier, Stefanos Stefanopoulos and asked him to form a new government.
- Died: Shirley Jackson, 48, American author best known for her controversial 1948 story "The Lottery"; of heart failure in her home in Vermont

== August 9, 1965 (Monday) ==
- An explosion and flash fire killed 53 construction workers who were working inside a 170-foot (52 m) deep missile silo near Searcy, Arkansas. A U.S. Air Force crew closed the hatches to prevent the Titan II missile inside from exploding, smothering the fire but sealing the workers inside. The men were all civilians working for Peter Kiewit and Sons Construction Company, and were working to remodel the silo's physical plant; the missile's warhead had been removed before work had started.

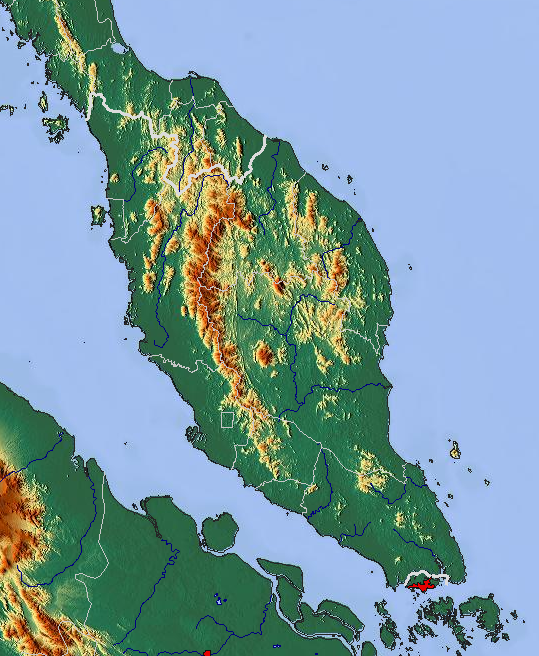
Singapore (marked in red)

- By a vote of 126 to 0, the Parliament of the Federation of Malaysia passed the Singapore Amendment Act to the Malaysian Constitution, expelling Singapore from the union that had existed since 1963. Soon afterward, Lee Kuan Yew, who had been governing Singapore since 1959 under British, and then Malaysian authority, announced that Singapore was declaring its sovereignty as a separate nation. As the new Prime Minister of an independent Singapore, he held a press conference and "was overcome by his emotions when narrating the sequence of events leading to Singapore's proclamation of independence earlier that morning", crying in front of a national television audience. "Depending on which history book you read," an author would note later, "Singapore separated of its own accord from Malaysia... or it was evicted."
- On orders from U.S. Attorney General Nicholas Katzenbach, the United States Civil Service Commission dispatched federal examiners to register African-Americans in nine counties where few had been allowed to vote. The order came three days after the Voting Rights Act was signed into law. The counties affected were the parishes of East Carroll, East Feliciana, and Plaquemines in Louisiana; Leflore and Madison County in Mississippi; and four counties in Alabama (Dallas, Hale, Lowndes, and Marengo). Over 1,000 new voters were registered on the first day.

== August 10, 1965 (Tuesday) ==
Jordan gets green area, Saudi Arabia gets red

- Representatives of the Kingdom of Jordan and the Kingdom of Saudi Arabia signed a border agreement in Amman, with the Saudis receiving 4,347 square miles (11,260 km^{2}) of Jordanian territory, and Jordan getting 3,726 square miles (9,650 km^{2}) of Saudi land along the Gulf of Aqaba and the Red Sea. Jordan's seacoast was thus extended from 3 miles (4.8 km) to 15.5 miles (24.9 km) in length.
- A fire destroyed the only existing copies of hundreds of MGM films after erupting in Vault 7, a storage facility at the Metro-Goldwyn-Mayer studio backlot in Culver City, California, after an electrical short circuit ignited the flammable nitrate film. The initial explosion reportedly killed at least one person, and the resulting fire destroyed the entire contents of the vault, which included archived prints of silent and early sound films produced by MGM and its predecessors.
- President Johnson signed the Housing and Urban Development Act of 1965 into law. In signing the bill, Johnson commented, "Education matters a great deal. Health matters. Jobs matter. Equality of opportunity and individual dignity matter very much. But legislation and labors in all of these fields can never succeed unless and until every family has the shelter and the security, the integrity and the independence, and the dignity and the decency of a proper home."
- The United States returned exclusive jurisdiction over the Port of Manila and the city of Olongapo to the Philippines, and ceding more than 450 square miles (1,200 km^{2}) of territory back to the Philippine government, as part of an amendment to the agreement between the two nations on military bases.
- Israeli inventor Simcha Blass and his son established the Netafim Irrigation Company to revolutionize the irrigation process in the deserts of Palestine.
- Born:
  - Mike E. Smith, American jockey, Racing Hall of Fame inductee, winner of multiple Breeders' Cup races, as well as the 2005 Kentucky Derby, the 1993 Preakness and the 2010 and 2013 Belmont Stakes; in Roswell, New Mexico
  - Claudia Christian (Claudia Ann Coghlan), American TV actress best known for Babylon 5; in Glendale, California

== August 11, 1965 (Wednesday) ==
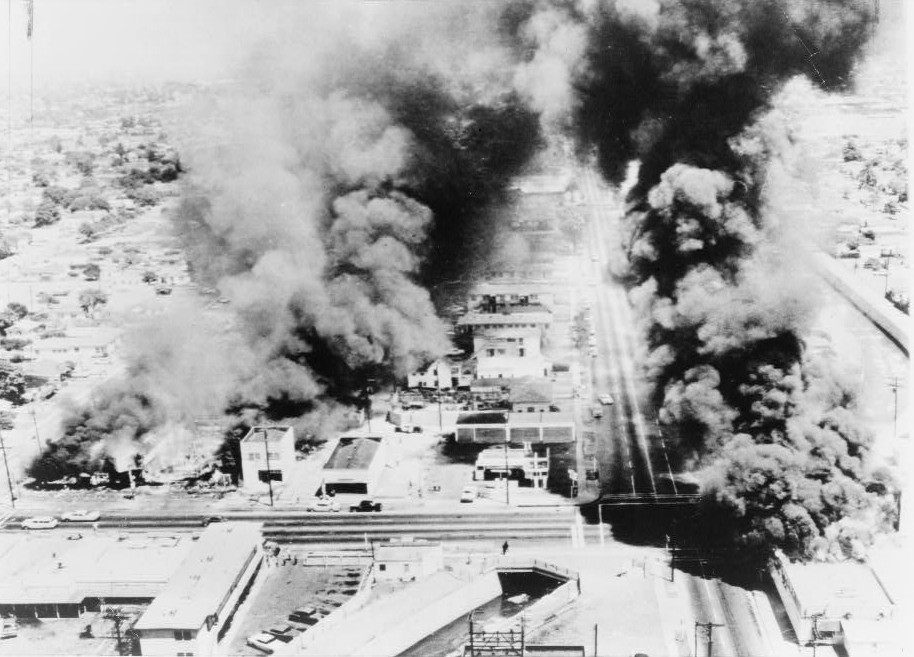
Aerial photo of the Watts Riot in which 34 people died and over 1,000 were injured

- The Watts riots were triggered in the evening in the mostly African-American section of Watts in Los Angeles, when a white California Highway Patrol officer, Lee W. Minikus, was flagged down by a passing black motorist, who told of seeing a car being driven recklessly. Minikus located the 1955 Buick, and it pulled over at the corner of 116th Street and Avalon Boulevard, where the black driver, Marquette Frye, was asked to step out and take a sobriety test on suspicion of drunken driving. The other man in the car, Frye's brother Ronald, ran home and brought the men's mother, Rena Price, to the scene. When Frye failed the test, Minikus notified him that he was under arrest and by 7:15, Minikus's CHP partner, a patrol car, and a tow truck arrived. By that time, the crowd of curious spectators had grown from about 25 people to several hundred. According to an investigative report, Marquette's mother began scolding him for drinking and "Marquette, who until then had been peaceful and cooperative, pushed her away and moved into the crowd, cursing and shouting at the officers that they would have to kill him to take him to jail." As the tension increased, the three family members and the three officers were scuffling, more highway patrolmen arrived and Los Angeles Police Department officers were called in, and the Watts Riots began. By the time that the rioting ended six days later, 34 people had been killed, 1,032 had been injured, and 3,952 arrested, and there was more than $40,000,000 of damage.
- A road accident killed 29 people and seriously injured 11 others in Turkey, when a bus traveling between Istanbul and Ankara collided with a stalled tanker truck that was carrying nitric acid. Both vehicles had rolled off the road and into a ditch, where a pool of the truck's deadly liquid cargo had accumulated. Most of the casualties were bus passengers who had survived the crash, but then escaped from the bus and plunged into the ditch. Twenty-three died at the scene, and six others (including the truck driver) died of their burn injuries after reaching the hospital.
- Abe Fortas was confirmed as the newest justice of the U.S. Supreme Court by a voice vote in the Senate, despite protests by Republican senators that he was "a security risk", "totally lacking in judicial temperament", and unqualified beyond being a personal friend of the President.
- Born:
  - Shinji Mikami, Japanese video game designer, director, and producer who created the Resident Evil and Dino Crisis series; in Iwakuni, Yamaguchi
  - Viola Davis, American stage, film, and TV actress, winner of the Tony Award in 2010 for her role in Fences; in St. Matthews, South Carolina
- Died: Bill Woodfull, 67, Australian cricketer

== August 12, 1965 (Thursday) ==
- Nineteen days after the United States learned that North Vietnam had bases around its capital from which to fire surface-to-air missiles, the North Vietnamese revealed that they had mobile missile units that could be taken to any location, shooting down a U.S. Navy A-4 Skyhawk attack jet that was flying 50 miles (80 km) southwest of Hanoi. Lieutenant (j.g.) Donald H. Brown Jr. of the USS Coral Sea was killed in the crash, becoming the first U.S. Navy flier to be downed by a SAM missile.
- A Paraense Curtiss C-46A-50-CU Commando, registration PP-BTH, en route to Cuiabá, caught fire and crashed in Buracão, close to Barra do Bugre, in the State of Mato Grosso, Brazil. All 13 passengers and crew were killed.
- Gemini Program Office announced its decision to use the new, lightweight 9 pounds (4.1 kg) G5C space suit on Gemini 7. The suit was a major improvement in comfort and normal mobility without sacrificing basic pressure integrity or crew safety.

== August 13, 1965 (Friday) ==
- The rock group Jefferson Airplane made its first appearance on the opening night of the Matrix nightclub in San Francisco, co-owned by band member Marty Balin.
- Max Scherr, a 49-year-old political activist in Berkeley, California, published the first issue of the Berkeley Barb, the original "underground newspaper".
- Elizabeth Lane became the first woman to be appointed as a judge on Great Britain's High Court of Justice.
- Died: Hayato Ikeda, 65, Prime Minister of Japan from 1960 to 1964; from cancer of the larynx

== August 14, 1965 (Saturday) ==
- After a boycott of the South Korean National Assembly by the opposing parties, 110 of the 111 members from the Democratic Republican Party voted in favor of ratification of the controversial peace treaty between South Korea and Japan. The other member of the DRP, which held the overwhelming majority of the 175 seats in the Assembly, abstained.
- The Indian Army clashed with the Army of Pakistan in response to the invasion of the Indian side of the disputed Kashmir territory, after crossing into the Pakistani side near Tithwal. Using a barrage of artillery against Pakistani positions in the northern mountains, they seized strategic positions in the mountains to the north.
- The third season of the Bundesliga, West Germany's premier football league, began and marked the first Bundesliga season for FC Bayern Munich, which would win 16 league championships in 51 seasons.

== August 15, 1965 (Sunday) ==
- The Beatles performed the first stadium concert in the history of rock, playing before 55,600 people at Shea Stadium in New York City. An author would note later, "It was to be the first of a large number" of concerts played at sports stadiums, "as both promoters and musicians discovered that huge sums of money could be made literally overnight." The total ticket sales added up to $304,000 of which the Beatles received $160,000. After paying $30,000 to rent the stadium, $14,000 to the city of 130 police to be present, $11,000 for insurance, and other expenses, promoter Sid Bernstein made a profit of $7,000. Their 1965 North American tour would take them to outdoor stadiums in Atlanta, Chicago, Minneapolis, and San Diego, as well as to arenas at Toronto, Houston, Portland, Los Angeles, and San Francisco.
- Two American high school students broke existing world records in swimming competition at the National AAU Swimming and Diving U.S. national championships at Maumee, Ohio. Kendis Moore, a 16-year-old from Phoenix, set a new mark for the women's 200 meter butterfly, at 2 minutes, 26.3 seconds. Steve Krause, a 16 year old from Seattle, swam the 1,500 meter freestyle in 16 minutes, 58.6 seconds, becoming the second person to swim the "metric mile" in less than 17 minutes.
- The Cathedral of Our Lady Assumed into Heaven and St Nicholas, Galway, Ireland, designed by John J. Robinson, was dedicated.
- Dave Marr won the 1965 PGA Championship golf tournament, played at the Laurel Valley Golf Club in Ligonier, Pennsylvania.
- Jo Siffert won the 1965 Mediterranean Grand Prix, held in Italy at the Autodromo di Pergusa, Sicily.
- Born:
  - Rob Thomas, American author, producer, director and screenwriter; in Sunnyside, Washington
  - Vincent Kok, Chinese actor, director, and scriptwriter; in Hong Kong
  - Mark Labbett, English game show host; in Tiverton, Devon

== August 16, 1965 (Monday) ==
- All 30 people aboard United Airlines Flight 389 were killed when the Boeing 727 jet crashed into Lake Michigan, 19 miles (31 km) offshore from Fort Sheridan, Illinois. Flight 389 was approaching Chicago after departure from New York and was ordered to descend to and maintain an altitude of 6,000 feet (1,800 m). Instead of leveling off, however, the jet descended in less than 40 seconds at an estimated rate 157 feet per second (9,430 feet per minute (more than 150 feet per second or 100 miles per hour (160 km/h)), and impacted at 9:20 p.m. local time, with such force that the flight data recorder was never located. Although the 727s had seats for 130 passengers, only 24 were on board Flight 389; they and the crew of six were all killed, including Clarence "Clancy" Sayen, a former president of the Air Line Pilots Association.
- In his first speech as U.S. ambassador to the United Nations, Arthur J. Goldberg announced that the United States would no longer seek enforcement against the USSR and France of Article 19 of the UN Charter, which provides that member nations would lose their votes if they were more than two years delinquent in their payments to the international organization. "Until that statement," International Court of Justice President Stephen M. Schwebel would write later, "the United States, together with the United Kingdom, had led a majority of the membership of the Organization in a determined effort to uphold the financial authority of the United Nations."
- The Soviet Union released the first photographs ever taken of the northern hemisphere of the far side of the Moon, sent back to Earth by the Zond 3 space probe after it had flown within 6,200 miles (10,000 km) of Earth's satellite. In 1959, Lunik 3 had taken humankind's first photos of the Moon's "dark side", viewing the southern half from 37,000 miles (60,000 km). The closer view from the Zond probe showed 584 distinct craters, ranging in size from 6 miles (9.7 km) to 120 miles (190 km) across.
- Heavyweight boxer Joe Frazier, a gold medalist in the 1964 Summer Olympics, had his first professional bout, defeating Woody Goss in the first round of a fight in Philadelphia. He would win his first 25 fights, capturing the vacant world heavyweight championship in 1970, and defending it against Muhammad Ali in 1971, before losing to George Foreman in 1973.

== August 17, 1965 (Tuesday) ==
- President Sukarno of Indonesia announced what he called the "Proclamation of Indonesian Independence", a withdrawal from participation in the World Bank (the International Bank for Reconstruction and Development) and condemned the Vietnam War. After Sukarno's loss of power in 1966, Indonesia would resume its membership on February 21, 1967.
- William C. White, an African-American veteran of the Korean War and one of 21 who had defected to the People's Republic of China after being captured by North Korea, returned to the non-Communist world after more than 11 years. White, from Plumerville, Arkansas, walked across the border into Hong Kong, along with his Chinese wife and two children.
- At the United Nations, the United States presented a proposed treaty to stop the proliferation of nuclear weapons, with all signing parties agreeing not to provide weapons to other nations. The Soviet Union would present its own version on September 28.
- While inside a 27-foot (8.2 m) shaft in Smith's Cove on Oak Island, Nova Scotia, Robert Restall was overcome by hydrogen sulfide fumes. His son then went down the shaft and also lost consciousness. Restall's work partner Karle Graeser and two others, Cyril Hiltz and Andy DeMont, then attempted to save the two men. A visitor to the site, Edward White, had himself lowered on a rope into the shaft but was able to bring out only DeMont. Restall, his son, Graeser and Hiltz all died.

== August 18, 1965 (Wednesday) ==
- Operation Starlite began as 5,500 United States Marines destroyed a Viet Cong stronghold on the Van Tuong peninsula in Quảng Ngãi Province, in the first major American ground battle of the war. Three days earlier, the Marines had been alerted by a captured Viet Cong prisoner that 1,500 VC soldiers were camped nine miles away from the U.S. base at Chu Lai and preparing a massive attack. When the battle ended six days later, the Viet Cong had lost 573 confirmed dead, and 115 estimated additional killed, while 51 U.S. Marines were killed and 203 wounded.
- Born: Ikue Ōtani, Japanese voice actress best known as the voice of Pikachu in the Pokémon series; in Kashiwazaki

== August 19, 1965 (Thursday) ==
- The Second Auschwitz trial came to an end in Frankfurt after 20 months, as sentences were handed down to 17 people who had aided the mass murders of inmates at the Auschwitz concentration camp during World War II. The proceedings were the longest and largest in German legal history. Six people, five of them former members of Nazi Germany's SS, were sentenced to life imprisonment. Sergeant Wilhelm Boger, the master torturer of the camp, had been convicted of "personally committing 114 murders and aiding many more". Sergeant Oswald Kaduk had been identified by trial witnesses as "The Butcher of Auschwitz" and had been in a Soviet prison until 1956 before being indicted for murder charges in West Germany. Medical Sergeant Josef Kiehr had admitted killing as many as 300 people by injecting carbolic acid into their hearts. Captain Franz Hofman, the Auschwitz security chief and the Commandant of its camp for Roma (gypsy) prisoners, was already serving a life sentence for murders carried out at the Dachau concentration camp. The other two were a guard, Corporal Stefan Baretski; and an inmate, Emil Bednarek, who had betrayed his fellow prisoners in order to receive privileges. West Germany had abolished the death penalty when it promulgated its first constitution in 1949. Eleven others were given prison terms ranging from three to 14 years, and three defendants were acquitted. The trial had started on December 20, 1963, and saw testimony from 358 witnesses, most of whom were survivors of the Holocaust. Fifty years later, during the trial of 93-year old Oskar Groning in 2015, it would be estimated that, "of an estimated 6,500 SS men who served in Auschwitz and survived the war, only 49 were punished" by tribunals in West Germany and East Germany.
- Two students from Penn State (Pennsylvania State University) sneaked into NASA's launch area and came within 200 yards (180 m) of Launch Pad 19, where Gemini 5 was scheduled for a liftoff. The two young men, Gary Ralph Young, 22, and Theodore Lee Ballenger, 17, were spotted by a closed circuit television camera which "picked up a view of a barefooted, barechested young man relaxing in the sand". Young told arresting officers that "I didn't realize it was dangerous" and that he had come within 200 feet (61 m) of the Titan rocket, and that Ballenger had stopped further away, both intending to get a very close view of the liftoff. "When we went in there and walked past the first guard," Young said, "he was too busy smoking a cigarette to see us. Is this the type of security we have for the U.S. Government?" Both were fined $100 and sentenced to six months in jail, probated for two years. The countdown for the launch was uninterrupted by their morning intrusion, but was halted at 1:08 p.m., only ten minutes before liftoff, because of problems with telemetry. As with all previous American crewed launches, the three American television networks had pre-empted their regular programming and commercials for the entire day.
- King Constantine II named Ilias Tsirimokos to become the new Prime Minister of Greece to succeed the government of Georgios Athanasiadis-Novas that had collapsed after only three weeks. The Tsirimokos administration would last only ten days before his government, like that of Athanasiadis, failed a vote of no confidence.
- West German diplomat Rolf Pauls presented his credentials to Israeli President Zalman Shazar to become the first German ambassador to the State of Israel.
- Born: Kyra Sedgwick, American television actress known for portraying LAPD interrogator Brenda Leigh Johnson on The Closer; in New York City

== August 20, 1965 (Friday) ==
- Diplomat Asher Ben-Natan became the first Ambassador from Israel to Germany, presenting his credentials to the Bundesrat President in Bonn, the capital of West Germany. East Germany had no formal diplomatic relations.
- The U.S. Manned Space Flight Center announced a four-month schedule to begin work on the concept of an S-IVB Orbital Workshop (OWS), a precursor to the first U.S. space station, with the idea of converting a used Saturn 4 rocket stage for a shelter suitable for extended crewed habitation and use. The project began immediately, with participation from Douglas Aircraft Company, which had built the rocket stage.
- More than 200 young men training at Camp Breckinridge, a federal Job Corps center in Morganfield, Kentucky, rioted for three hours. Ten people were injured and windows at the administration building were smashed after a brawl broke out in the cafeteria. Most of the 670 students were African-American males, ranging in age from 16 to 21, who had dropped out of school and had come to the camp from large cities under a program administered by Southern Illinois University. The group was already dissatisfied with the poor quality of the food and the long waits in line.
- Died: Jonathan Daniels, 26, American Episcopal seminarian from Keene, New Hampshire, was shot dead in Hayneville, Alabama, while participating in the civil rights movement. Tom L. Coleman had been aiming a gun at a black teenager, Ruby Sales, and Daniels had pushed her out of the way and taken the bullet. Six weeks later, an all-white jury in Lowndes County acquitted Coleman of homicide charges after accepting his claim of self-defense. Coleman had testified that Daniels had threatened him with a knife, even though no weapon was ever found.

== August 21, 1965 (Saturday) ==
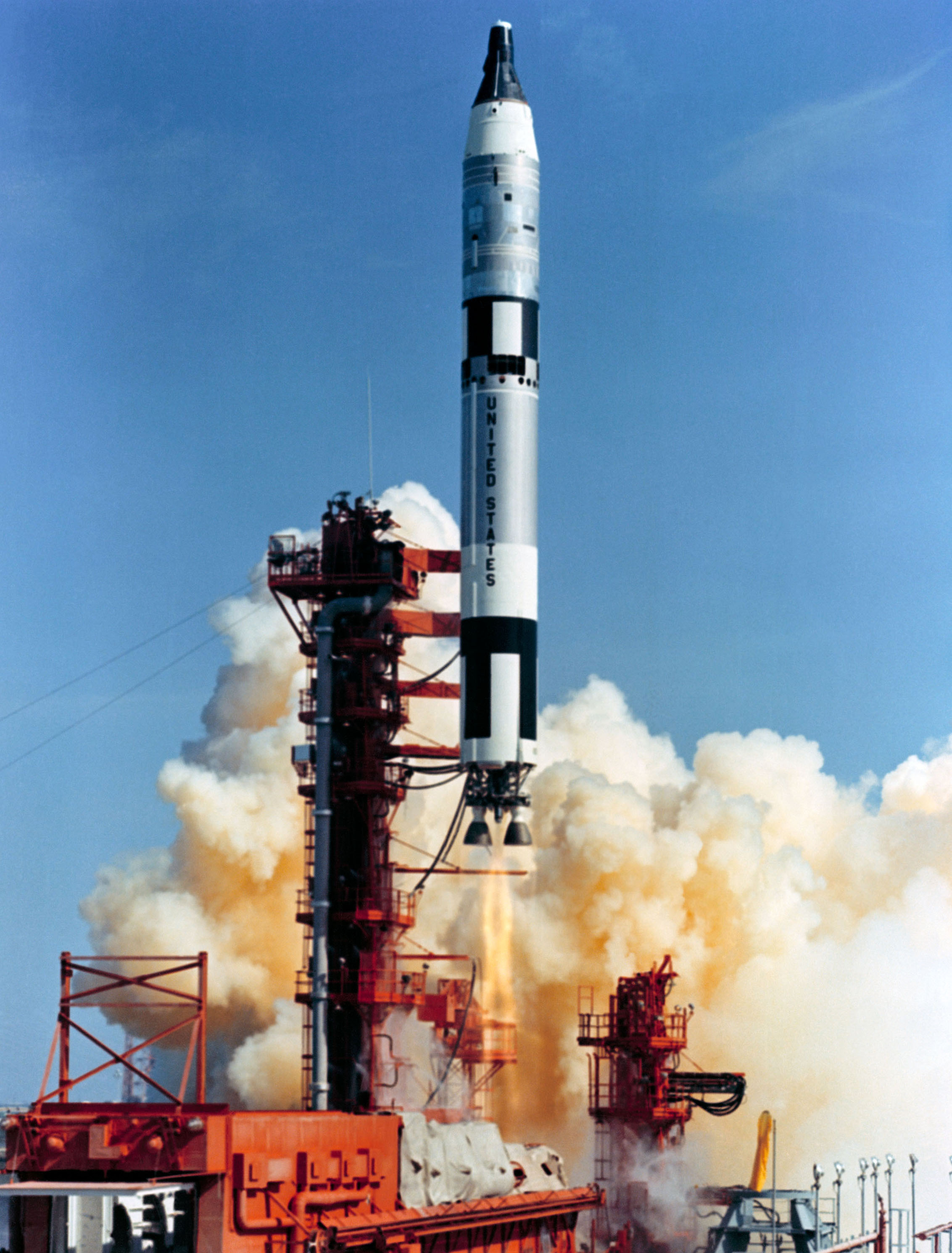
August 21, 1965: Launch of Gemini 5

- Gemini 5 lifted off at precisely 10:00 a.m. from complex 19 at Cape Kennedy in Florida and began its first orbit six minutes later. The crew comprised command pilot Astronaut L. Gordon Cooper, Jr., and pilot Astronaut Charles Conrad, Jr. The mission would break the record for longest crewed spaceflight and would be the first to test fuel cells as a supply for electrical power. Gemini 5 was the 11th crewed American space mission, and the 19th for the world's nations.
- The CBS Television Network announced that, effective immediately, it would reduce the amount of uninterrupted live coverage that it would give to space missions. The network's decision came after it (and its competitors, ABC and NBC) had pre-empted regular programming for seven hours on Thursday until the countdown had been halted on the Gemini 5 launch.
- The Great National Assembly adopted the 1965 Constitution of Romania, which was published in Monitorul Oficial the same day. The country would thereafter be called the Socialist Republic of Romania, and the "brotherly" alliance with the Soviet Union would be replaced with the principle of "respect for national sovereignty and independence, equality of rights and reciprocal advantage, non-interference in internal matters".
- The South African rugby union team lost, 13 to 0, to New Zealand at Dunedin during their tour of Australasia.
- The Alibates Flint Quarries in Texas were designated a United States National Monument.
- Died: Odile Defraye, 77, Belgian road racing cyclist

== August 22, 1965 (Sunday) ==
- In U.S. baseball, San Francisco Giants batter Juan Marichal struck Los Angeles Dodgers catcher John Roseboro in the head after Roseboro removed his own helmet and mask during an argument. Earlier, Marichal had thrown two "brushback" pitches near the head of Dodger leadoff batter Maury Wills. When Marichal came up to bat against Sandy Koufax in the last of the third inning, Roseboro's throw back to Koufax grazed Marichal's ear, and the sparking a 14-minute brawl. After order was restored, Roseboro required 14 stitches to his head while Marichal was ejected and subsequently suspended and fined Warren Giles, President of the National League. At the time, the Dodgers and Giants were in first and second place in the National League pennant race, and the Giants' 4–3 win, powered by a home run from Willie Mays off of Sandy Koufax put them at 69 wins, 51 losses (.575), only 0.001 behind the 72-53 (.576) Dodgers.
- Born: David Reimer, Canadian man raised as a girl after a botched circumcision and involuntary sex reassignment; in Winnipeg, Manitoba (committed suicide by gunshot, 2004)

== August 23, 1965 (Monday) ==
- Dr. Who and the Daleks, the first theatrical film ever based on a television series, was released in the United Kingdom during the closing weeks of the school summer holiday. In order to qualify for the U-certificate for viewing by universal audiences (equivalent to the later "G" rating in the United States), the filmmakers "rather than trying to establish continuity or canonicity, transformed the principal characters and their relationships", casting Peter Cushing rather than TV's William Hartnell as a more cheerful version of The Doctor and making the story more suitable for children.
- The International Conference on Family Planning Programs, the first worldwide meeting on the issue of controlling the "population explosion", opened in Geneva with representatives from 36 nations.
- Died: Mostafa El-Nahas, 86, Prime Minister of the Kingdom of Egypt on five occasions between 1928 and 1952

== August 24, 1965 (Tuesday) ==
- A new word, "hypertext", entered the English language at the annual conference of the Association for Computing Machinery in Pittsburgh, as Ted Nelson presented his paper, A File Structure for the Complex, The Changing and the Indeterminate, and described his vision of "a body of written or pictorial material interconnected in such a complex way that it could not conveniently be presented or represented on paper", making it possible for a global publishing system that could "grow indefinitely, gradually including more and more of the world's written knowledge", with "every feature a novelist or absent-minded professor could want, holding everything he wanted in just the complicated way he wanted it to be held, and handling notes and manuscripts in as subtle and complex ways as he wanted them to be handled."
- In the Soviet Union, arrests began of 26 "nationally minded Ukrainian intellectuals" throughout the Ukrainian SSR in "the first major KGB operation of this sort since Stalin's death". Following searches of homes and interrogation of suspects, authors Andrei Sinyavsky and Yuli Daniel would be put on trial in 1966 on charges of "anti-Soviet agitation and propaganda". It was speculated that the intent was to intimidate Ukrainian dissenters and to thwart defiance against the government, but the result was public protests and a resurgence of Ukrainian nationalism.
- President Gamal Abdel Nasser of Egypt and King Faisal of Saudi Arabia announced that they had reached a nine-point agreement at the Saudi Arabian port of Jeddah for the gradual withdrawal of 50,000 Egyptian troops in Yemen, and free elections in that Arab nation in 1966 for voters to choose between restoring the monarchy or continuing with the republic.
- The crash of a C-130 Hercules cargo plane killed 58 of the 71 U.S. military personnel on board as it plunged into Yau Tong Bay, shortly after takeoff from Hong Kong. Most of the passengers were U.S. Marines who had been on leave and were returning to South Vietnam.
- Born: Marlee Matlin, American actress; in Morton Grove, Illinois
- Died: Orvil A. Anderson, 70, American pioneer balloonist, later a U.S. Air Force major general, who set an altitude record in 1935 of 72,395 feet (22,066 m)

== August 25, 1965 (Wednesday) ==
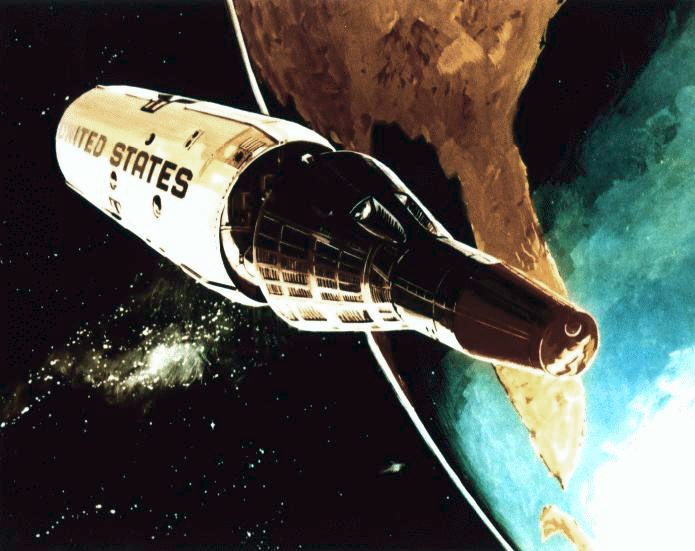
Artist's rendering of Manned Orbiting Laboratory and Gemini reentry vehicle

- In a press conference at the White House, U.S. President Lyndon B. Johnson announced that he had given the go-ahead for the United States Air Force to develop an American space station, the $1.5-million Manned Orbiting Laboratory (MOL), to be launched by 1968. Such a program, the President said, would bring "new knowledge about what man is able to do in space." Further, MOL "will enable us to relate that ability to the defense of America." The MOL was to be used primarily for military reconnaissance, and when it became clear that uncrewed satellites were more efficient at spying on the enemy, the MOL project would be canceled on June 10, 1969, after $1.4 billion had been spent. NASA would take contracts that the Air Force had had for development of the station, and would launch Skylab into orbit in 1973.
- A series of explosions killed 12 people and injured 22 others at a Dupont chemical plant in Louisville, Kentucky, where the rubber substitute Neoprene was being manufactured. The initial explosion happened at 10:25 in the morning; another blast happened at 6:30 in the evening while rescuers were looking for bodies. A compressor that circulated vinylacetylene in gaseous form overheated, causing the first blast.
- President Johnson directed all federal agencies to adopt "Planning, Programming, Budgeting Systems" (PPBS) based on the model introduced by U.S. Secretary of Defense Robert McNamara. Johnson described PPBS as a "new and revolutionary system" that would bring "the full promise of a finer life... to every American at the lowest possible cost" in advancing his Great Society initiative. The U.S. government would not abandon the approach until 1971; an observer would write in 1989 that PPBS had been "almost a total failure" and asked the question, "By the way, who is responsible for the billions of dollars and millions of man-hours wasted on this gimmick?"
- The only functioning X-19 airplane, an experimental VTOL aircraft, was destroyed in a crash at the Federal Aviation Administration's National Aviation Facilities Experimental Center near Atlantic City, New Jersey. Both pilots ejected safely, but the accident effectively ended the X-19 program.
- Died: Archibald "Moonlight" Graham, 85, American physician and baseball player whose major league career was limited to one inning of a major league game, without getting a turn at bat. His unusual story would later make him an important character in the popular 1989 film Field of Dreams.

== August 26, 1965 (Thursday) ==
- The Soviet Ministry of Defense ordered implementation of a project to land the first man on the Moon before the U.S. Apollo program could accomplish the task, directing the chiefs of the Soviet space program and the Soviet Army's missile program to work together on the goal the Soyuz 7K-L1 program. Sergei Korolev led the OKB (Opytnoye Konstruktorskoye Buro or Experimental Construction Bureau) for the space program, OKB-1, while Vladimir Chelomei guided OKB-52 for guided missiles. Together, the two would work on a multi-stage rocket, the N1-L3, to rival the American Saturn V, combining an extra stage with the powerful Proton rocket and a "stripped down" version of the Soyuz 7K-OK.
- President Johnson signed an Executive Order removing a marriage exemption from the draft, although married fathers between the ages of 19 and 26 were still exempt. Americans who got married before midnight on the 26th would remain exempt from conscription into military service. Hundreds of men drove to Nevada in order to get married without a waiting period, and would find out four days later that they had only deferred eligibility for four months; General Lewis B. Hershey announced on August 30 that all married, childless men (aged 19 to 26) would be eligible for the draft beginning in January 1966.
- At 8:06 a.m. Florida time, Gemini 5 astronauts Gordon Cooper and Pete Conrad broke the previous record for longest crewed spaceflight, the 119 hours and 6 minutes set by the Soviet Union's Valery Bykovsky on Vostok 5 in June 1963.
- The city of Gold River, British Columbia, was incorporated as the first creation from the Canadian province's "instant towns" program.
- John Coltrane recorded his album Sun Ship, which would eventually be released in 1971 after his death.
- Born: Marcus du Sautoy, British mathematician; in London

== August 27, 1965 (Friday) ==
- NASA administrator George E. Mueller ordered research work on suitable atmosphere selection for longer-term missions of "Phase II" crewed spaceflight, on orbiting space stations and eventually for interplanetary flight. Although the nominal duration for Phase II flights would initially be no more than 45 days, Mueller asked for Manned Space Center to evaluate atmosphere mixtures and pressures for missions of up to 135 days. At the time, the longest crewed space mission had lasted less than 8 days.
- The Beatles visited Elvis Presley at his home in the Bel Air neighborhood of Los Angeles, California. It would be the only time the band and the singer met. At the request of the band, no recordings or photographs of the occasion were taken for publication.
- Died: Charles Le Corbusier (Charles-Édouard Jeanneret-Gris), 77, legendary Swiss-born French architect who had designed the Headquarters of the United Nations building in New York City, and the planned city of Chandigarh in India, drowned while swimming in the Mediterranean Sea at the resort of Roquebrune-Cap-Martin. Although early reports listed his death as an accidental drowning he had been quickly rescued by other swimmers who saw him struggling; an autopsy showed that Le Corbusier had died of a heart attack.

== August 28, 1965 (Saturday) ==
- Subway, which would become the world's largest restaurant chain, with more than 26,000 franchises in the United States and more than 44,000 in 112 nations, held the grand opening of its first submarine sandwich restaurant. Fred DeLuca, a 17-year-old college freshman, borrowed $1,000 from a family friend, nuclear physicist Peter Buck, and opened "Pete's Super Submarines" at a storefront at 3851 Main Street in Bridgeport, Connecticut, on the corner of Main Street and Jewett Avenue. DeLuca would later relate that after opening several restaurants, he realized that "When people heard the name Pete's Submarines over the radio, they often thought they heard the words 'pizza marine'" and would ask for pizza. Looking for "a name that was short, clear, and difficult to mispronounce", DeLuca settled on the shorter form for the submarine sandwich, "sub", and "changed the name to Pete's Subway, and eventually to Subway."

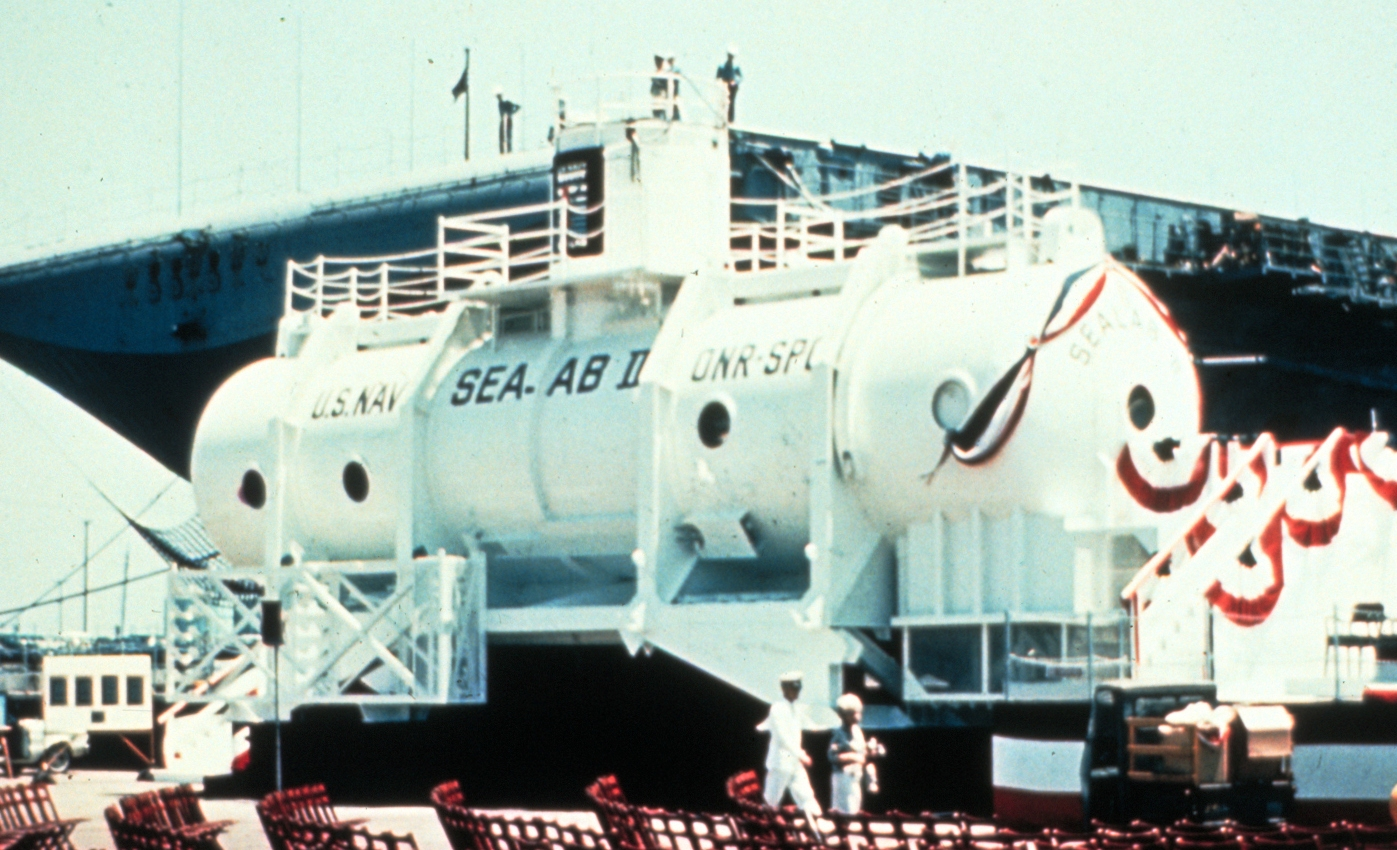
SEALAB II on the surface

- The first ten divers moved into the U.S. Navy's second undersea habitat, SEALAB II, to begin a 45-day stay in "a pressurized 57-foot-by-12-foot undersea laboratory perched on a ledge 210 feet below" the surface of the Pacific Ocean 0.5 miles (0.80 km) off the coast of La Jolla, California.
- Born:
  - Shania Twain, Canadian country music singer and songwriter; as Eilleen Regina Edwards in Windsor, Ontario
  - Gordon Darcy Lilo, Prime Minister of Solomon Islands from 2011 to 2014; in Ghatere (now Kolombangara)
  - Satoshi Tajiri, Japanese video game designer who created the Pokémon franchise; in Setagaya, Tokyo
- Died: Giulio Racah, 56, Italian-born Israeli theoretical physicist and mathematician for whom the Racah W-coefficient and the Racah parameter are named, as well as a crater on the Moon. Professor Racah was visiting his hometown of Florence and apparently died from carbon monoxide poisoning caused by a defective space heater.

== August 29, 1965 (Sunday) ==
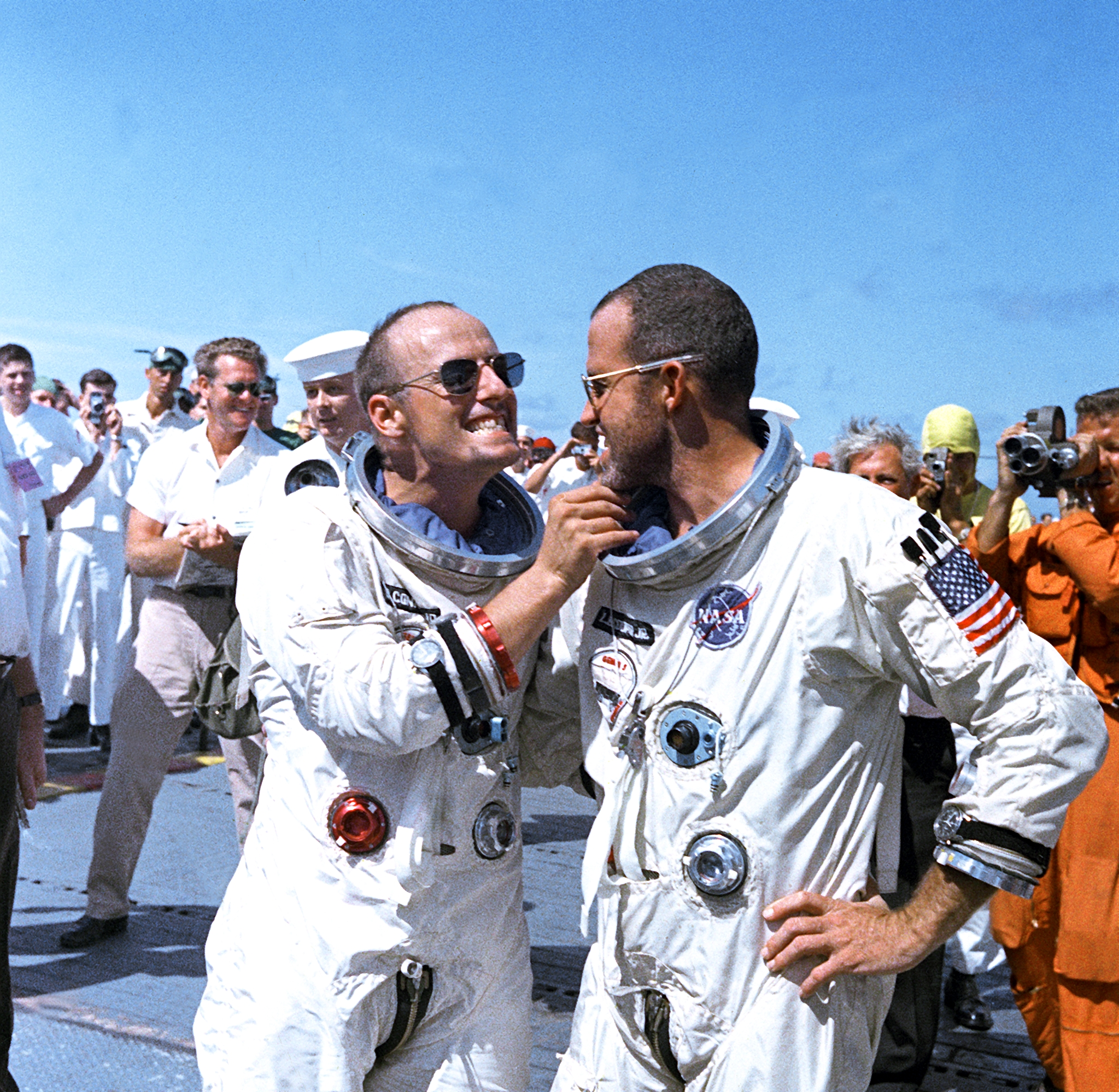
August 29, 1965: Conrad tweaks Cooper's beard after Gemini 5 splashdown

- Gemini 5 splashed down at 8:55 a.m. in the Atlantic Ocean after the longest crewed spaceflight up to that time, just 65 minutes short of eight days (7 days, 22 hours, 55 minutes) in outer space. Astronauts L. Gordon Cooper, Jr. and Charles Conrad, Jr. made 120 orbits around the Earth and reportedly traveled 3,338,200 miles (5,372,300 km) in their circuits of the globe. The landing point was 89 miles (143 km) short, the result of incorrect navigation coordinates transmitted to the spacecraft computer from the ground network. The capsule was picked up by the prime recovery ship, the aircraft carrier USS Lake Champlain (CV-39), in a little more than an hour.
- The government of Indonesia arrested the five Koeswoyo brothers, who performed their own and other bands' rock music under the band name "Koes Bros". John, Yok, Yon, Nomo, and Tonny Koeswoyo had originally emulated the Everly Brothers, and later copied the style of The Beatles, which got them in trouble on the charge of playing what President Sukarno called "ngak-ngik-ngok music" (ngakngik-ngek being Indonesian slang for "crazy mixed-up noises"). They would not be released until October.
- Only ten days after he was named as Prime Minister of Greece, Ilias Tsirimokos was forced to resign after failing a vote of no confidence, 159 to 135. Tsirimokos was the third Prime Minister in six weeks of political upheaval.
- The asteroid 2326 Tololo was discovered by the Indiana Asteroid Program at Goethe Link Observatory.
- Died: Paul Waner, 62, American baseball player who batted .333 lifetime with 3,152 hits and was inducted into the Baseball Hall of Fame in 1952

== August 30, 1965 (Monday) ==
- A glacier avalanche killed 88 workers when it buried the Mattmark Dam construction site. The Allalin Glacier, at Saas-Fee in Switzerland, fractured and sent a landslide of ice that piled to 100 feet (30 m) deep . Another 18 employees had been able to escape the path of the avalanche, which happened at about 6:00 p.m. when a huge section of the glacier broke loose from Strahlhorn mountain and traveled 1,650 feet (500 m) in about 90 seconds to a construction camp where the men, mostly Italian, had been staying. Most of the dead were late shift workers who were asleep when 250 tonnes (250 long tons; 280 short tons) of debris had overrun their camp, while some were eating their evening meal. Reportedly, the air pressure from the approaching mass shattered the buildings before they were buried.
- Formerly all-white schools across the southern United States opened the 1965–1966 school year, without incident, for African-American students, as desegregation of public schools became nearly universal. Former sites of segregated schools, including Atlanta and Valdosta, Georgia; Mansfield, Texas, Philadelphia, Mississippi, Selma, Alabama, and Lexington, Kentucky, integrated peacefully. The impetus for integration was Title VI of the Civil Rights Act of 1964, which denied federal funding to any public school district that discriminated based on race, color, religion, sex, or national origin, and required schools to submit a plan for desegregation by August 31. A week earlier, The New York Times had reported that about 400 of the 5,000 school districts (such as Glascock County, Georgia or Amite County, Mississippi) in 17 southern and border states had elected to forego federal funding rather than desegregate, but by week's end, the number had dropped to 172.
- General Antonio Imbert Barrera announced that he and the other members of the military junta governing the Dominican Republic would resign to make way for a civilian government.
- Rock musician Bob Dylan released his influential album Highway 61 Revisited, featuring the song "Like a Rolling Stone".
- Casey Stengel, the 75-year-old manager of the New York Mets, announced his retirement after 55 years in baseball.

== August 31, 1965 (Tuesday) ==
- A truce was declared in the Dominican Republic between the "Constitutionalists" (supporters of the deposed Juan Bosch administration) and conservative military forces, led by army general Elías Wessin y Wessin. American peacekeeping forces began to be withdrawn shortly afterward. In the course of the war, a total of 44 American soldiers died, 27 in action, whilst an estimated 6,000 to 10,000 Dominicans, mostly civilians, were killed.
- Amendments to the United Nations Charter went into effect, increasing the number of UN Security Council members from 11 to 15 (Article 23); the number of votes needed to affirm a Security Council decision changing, from 7 of 11, to 9 of 15 (Article 27); and the number of members of the UN Economic and Social Council from 18 to 27 (Article 61).
- All nine men on a U.S. military transport were missing and presumed dead after the plane disappeared while flying from Nha Trang in South Vietnam to Manila in the Philippines.
- President Johnson of the United States signed a law penalizing the burning of draft cards with up to 5 years in federal prison and a $1,000 fine.
- Leonard Marks became director of the United States Information Agency.
- Died: Henri Mignet, 71, French aircraft designer
