= September 1965 =

Month of 1965

<<	September 1965					>>
Su	Mo	Tu	We	Th	Fr	Sa
			1	2	3	4
5	6	7	8	9	10	11
12	13	14	15	16	17	18
19	20	21	22	23	24	25
26	27	28	29	30

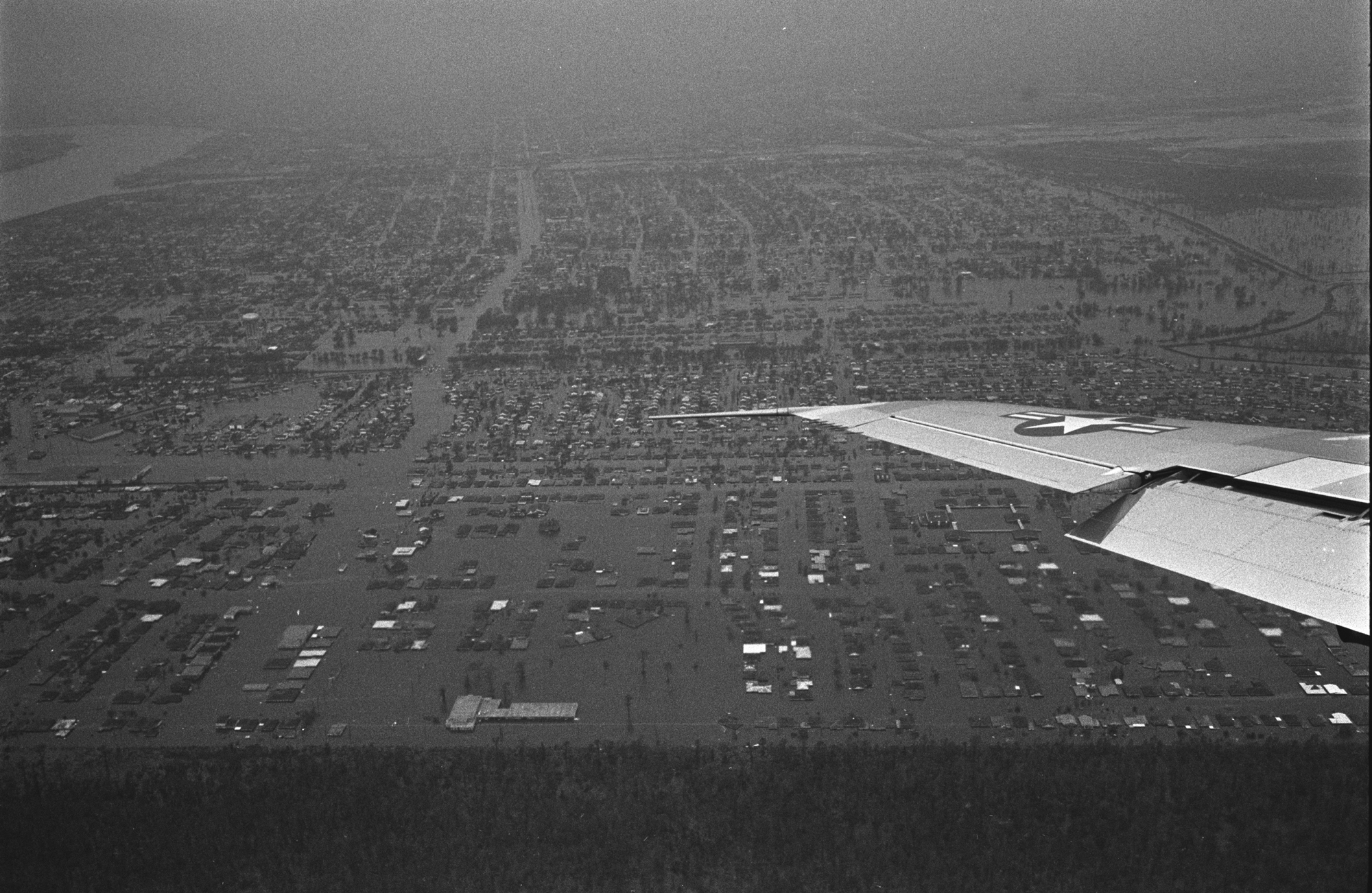
September 9, 1965: "Billion Dollar Betsy" causes $1.42 billion in damage, kills 76 in New Orleans

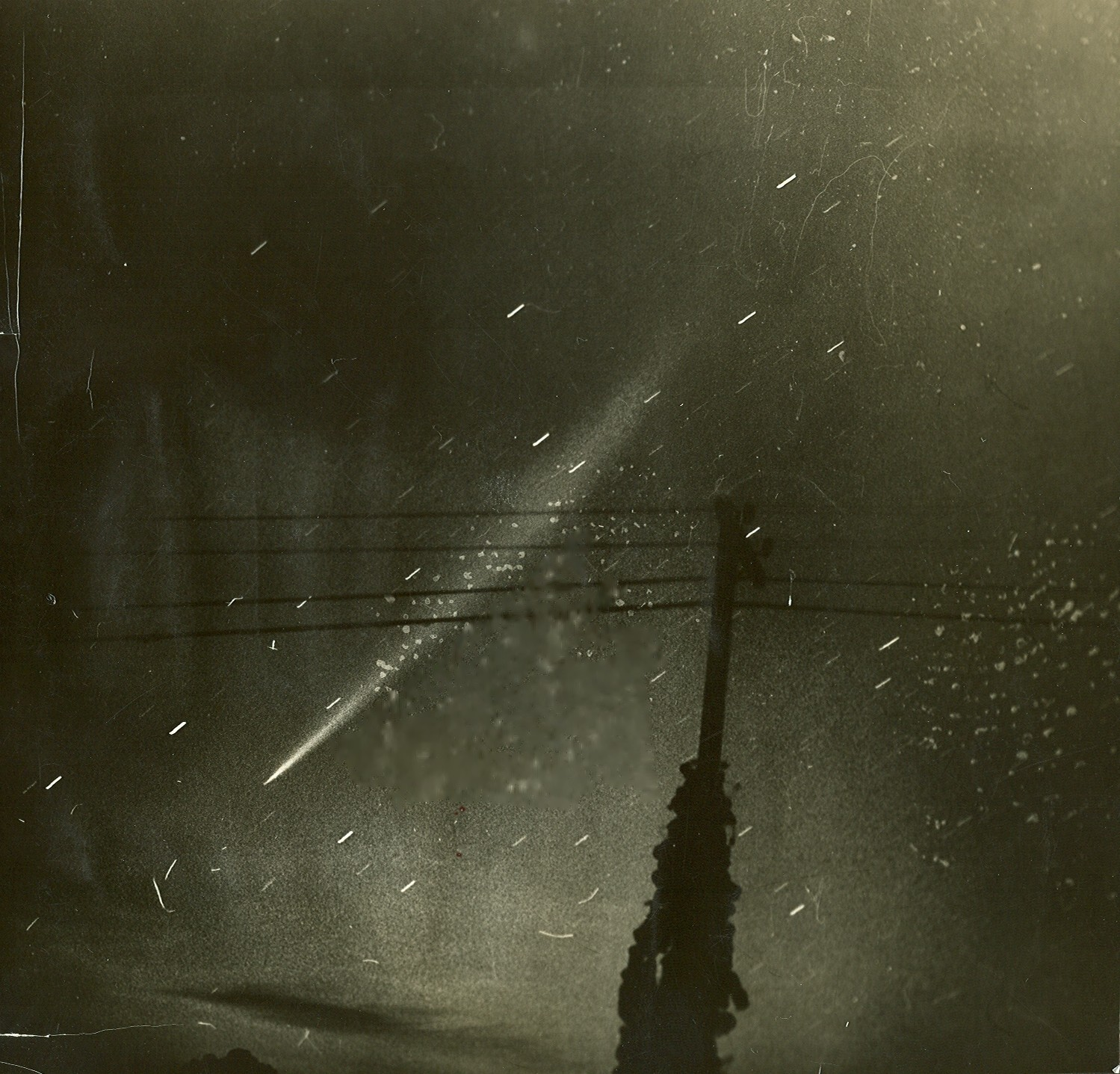
September 18, 1965: Comet Ikeya–Seki discovered by two amateur astronomers in Japan

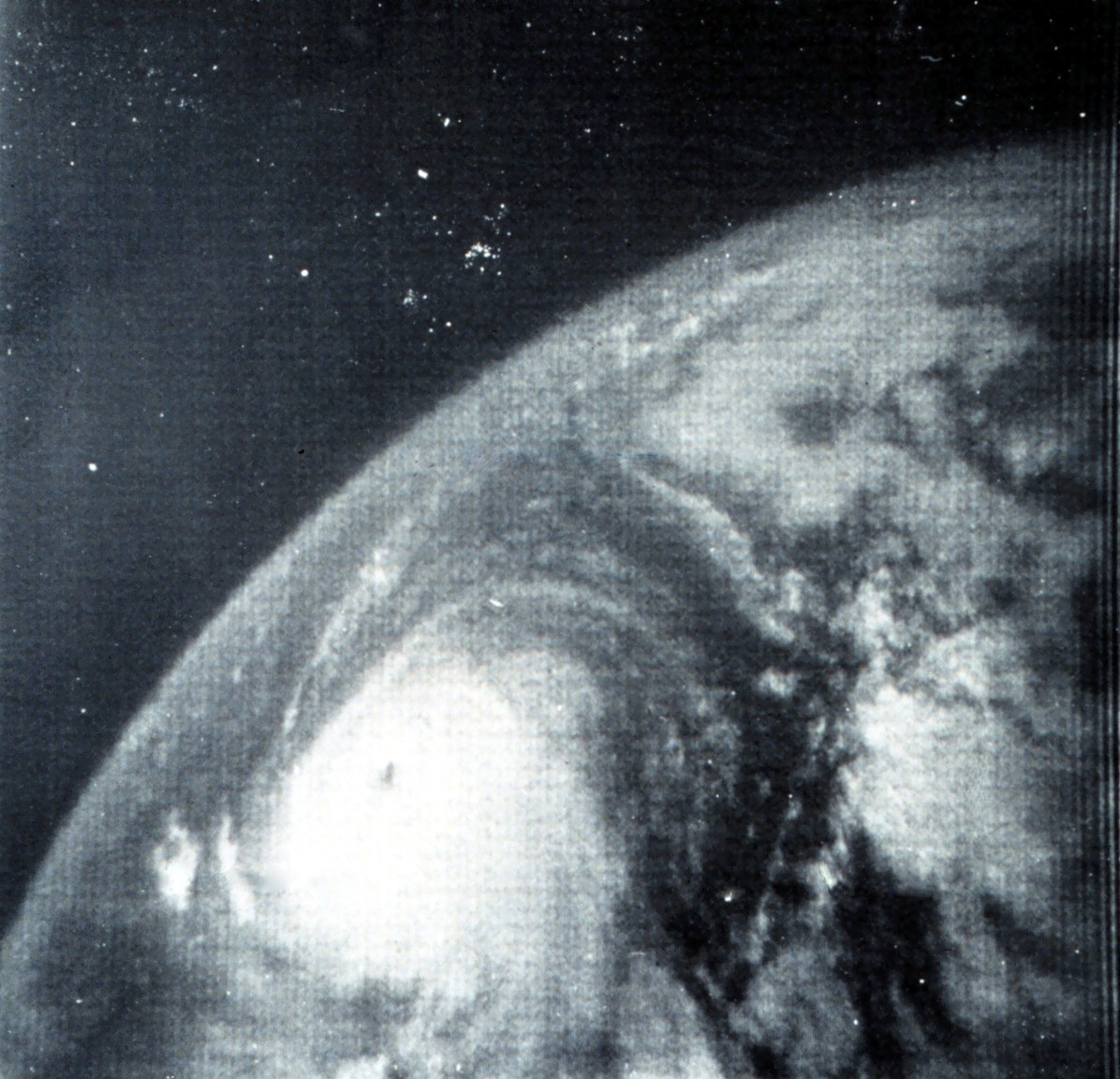
Hurricane Betsy seen from weather satellite

The following events occurred in September 1965:

== September 1, 1965 (Wednesday) ==
- The People's Republic of China lodged a protest with the United Kingdom for allowing American troops to visit Hong Kong while on furlough. The Chinese, who were obligated under a 99-year lease to allow the British to use the area as a colony until 1997, likened the recreational use to the placement of an American military base in mainland China. The diplomatic note was delivered in Beijing to British Chargé d'Affaires K. M. Wilford, who was summoned to the Chinese Foreign Ministry by Hsieh Li, the Director of the Ministry's Department for Western European affairs.
- At 3:30 in the morning local time, Pakistan launched Operation Grand Slam, a surprise attack into India, with the objective of capturing the vital town of Akhnoor in Jammu and Kashmir, so as to sever communications and cut off supply routes to Indian troops. Pakistani leader Ayub Khan stated that "Hindu morale will not stand more than a couple of hard blows at the right time and place". India responded by calling in its air force.
- The United States Marine Corps announced that it was cutting the amount of training of new recruits from 12 weeks of boot camp to only eight, in response to the sudden increase in combat troops assigned to the Vietnam War. "The aim is to process 30,000 additional men," a report noted, "without adding to present marine facilities or increasing the staff of instructors," effectively educating 50% more U.S. Marines each year.
- Former U.S. President Dwight D. Eisenhower paid a final visit to his birthplace in Denison, Texas, and spent half an hour touring the house on 609 South Lamar Avenue where he had been born almost 75 years earlier. Eisenhower gave a speech at the auditorium at Denison High School, which had been renamed in his honor after alumni had protested against renaming the entire school.
- The People's Republic of China created the Tibet Autonomous Region, giving the conquered Buddhist Kingdom of Tibet limited authority on matters of education and language policy, and a Tibetan member of the Chinese Communist Party, Ngapoi Ngawang Jigme, as the regional chairman.
- Born: Craig McLachlan, Australian actor and singer; in Long Jetty, New South Wales

== September 2, 1965 (Thursday) ==
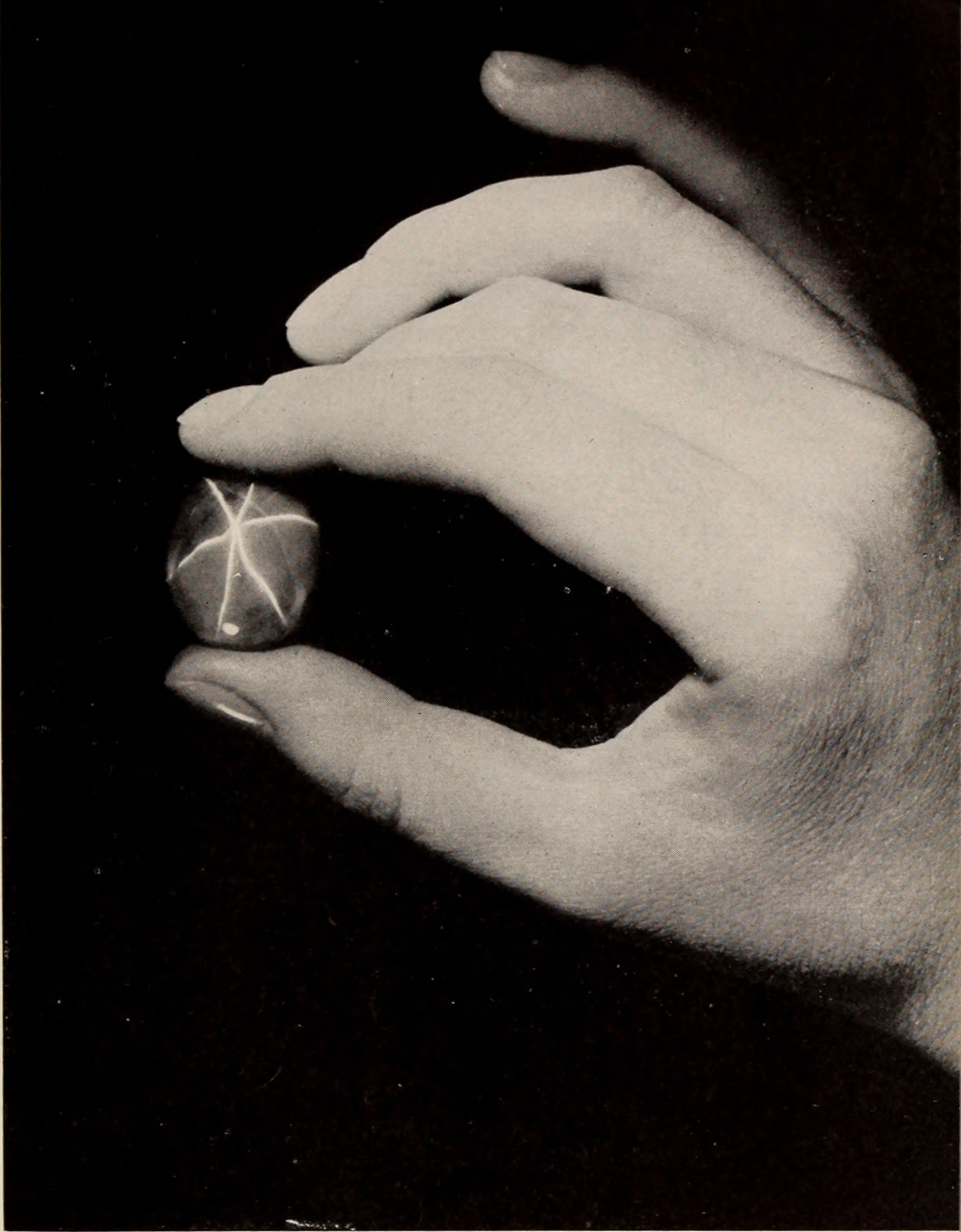
DeLong Star Ruby

- The valuable DeLong Star Ruby, stolen on October 29, 1964, was recovered from a telephone booth at a toll road service plaza, on the Sunshine State Parkway 4 miles (6.4 km) from Palm Beach, Florida. Multimillionaire John D. MacArthur arranged for $25,000 ransom to be released to the callers after verifying the authenticity of the ruby.
- Former presidential candidate and U.S. Senator Barry Goldwater filed a lawsuit against publisher Ralph Ginzburg and his publishing company, Fact Magazine, Inc., seeking two million dollars for libel arising from an article questioning the candidate's sanity. The front cover of the September–October 1964 issue of Fact magazine had the headline "1,889 psychiatrists say Goldwater is psychologically unfit to be President", and in Ginzburg's article (including an excerpt reprinted on the back of the magazine) was the statement, "He consciously wants to destroy the world with atomic bombs. He is a mass murderer at heart. He is amoral and immoral. He is a dangerous lunatic." Goldwater would be awarded $75,000 by a federal jury in 1968 and the U.S. Supreme Court would ultimately affirm the decision in 1970.
- Two homes in Vandenberg Village, California, were damaged, and 41 people taken to the hospital, after debris from a destroyed missile fell on their neighborhood 6 miles (9.7 km) from Vandenberg Air Force Base. A Thor-Agena booster rocket had been launched from the base minutes earlier but then deviated from its course, and was destroyed by remote control at an altitude of 32,000 feet (9,800 m), sending flaming debris on the area below.
- American comedian Phyllis Diller, whose popular standup comic routine was based on her experiences as a housewife and on a mythical husband nicknamed "Fang", filed for divorce against her real husband of 25 years, Sherwood Diller. The uncontested divorce would be granted the following day.
- Tahir Yahya was forced to resign as Prime Minister of Iraq. The vacancy would be filled four days later by Arif Abd ar-Razzaq, who would flee the country on September 17 after only 10 days in office.
- Born: Lennox Lewis, British boxer who was world heavyweight boxing champion during much of the 1990s and early 2000s; in West Ham, London
- Died:
  - Émile Muselier, 83, Admiral of the Free French Naval Forces composed of ships that continued to fight World War II when France surrendered to Nazi Germany in 1940.
  - Johannes Bobrowski, 48, East German poet

== September 3, 1965 (Friday) ==
- India's Prime Minister Lal Bahadur Shastri approved a three-point policy in the nation's war against Pakistan, specifically, defending against Pakistan's attempts to seize control of Indian Kashmir; to destroy the offensive power of Pakistan's armed forces; and "to occupy only the minimum Pakistan territory necessary to achieve these purposes", removing troops "after the satisfactory conclusion of the war."
- The earliest known skateboard park opened in Tucson, Arizona. Surf City, located on 5140 East Speedway Road, billed itself as the "world's first championship skateboard course", provided free use of helmets to every participant who paid the one dollar admission fee, and offered to rent boards to kids who did not own one.
- Communist China's Vice-Premier Lin Biao, viewed as the eventual successor of party chairman Mao Zedong, published the widely circulated essay Long Live the Victory of the People's War!, providing the official view of China's role as a world power and a guide to fomenting similar "people's revolutions" in nations around the globe.
- Kosmos 84, the Soviet Union's first nuclear powered satellite, was launched into orbit. Its source of fuel was a radioisotope thermoelectric generator (RTG) fueled with polonium-210.
- Héctor García-Godoy became President of the Dominican Republic as the military junta turned over leadership of the Caribbean nation to civilians.
- Pope Paul VI issued the encyclical Mysterium fidei, reinforcing traditional Roman Catholic doctrine concerning the Eucharist.
- Born: Charlie Sheen, American film and television actor; as Carlos Irwin Estévez in New York City

== September 4, 1965 (Saturday) ==
- Newcomb Mott, a 27-year-old American book salesman from Boston, went sightseeing while staying at a hotel in the Norwegian town of Kirkenes, and ventured across Norway's border in the Finnmark province into the Soviet Union. Kirkenes police chief Gunnar Haarstad found that Mott had last been seen at the village of Elvenes, about a mile from the border, and that Russian border authorities confirmed on September 9 that Mott had been arrested for illegal entry. Mott would be convicted on November 24 of illegal entry and sentenced to 18 months in prison. By January 17, he would be dead, and Soviet authorities would say that he had committed suicide on a train that was taking him to a forced labor camp at Murmansk.
- Yorkshire defeated Surrey, 317 to 142, to win the championship game of the Gillette Cup, which had started as a single elimination tournament in April with all 17 of England's first-class county teams, and five minor teams that had been invited to participate. Geoff Boycott's 146 runs in the final at Lord's Cricket Ground, remains the highest ever scored in a county limited-overs final played there.
- In a rare show of defiance against the Communist government of the Soviet Union, public protests began in the Ukrainian SSR against the August 24 roundup of Ukrainian intellectuals by the KGB. The time chosen for the outcry was the premiere in Kiev of the new film by Sergei Parajanov, Shadows of Forgotten Ancestors.
- Born:
  - Michael Bentt, British-born professional boxer who briefly held the World Boxing Organization heavyweight title; in East Dulwich, London
  - Bowie Lam, Chinese television actor and singer; in Hong Kong
- Died:
  - Dr. Albert Schweitzer, 90, German Alsace-born Gabonese physician and missionary, and recipient of the 1952 Nobel Peace Prize, died at the hospital he had built in the African jungle at Lambarene in Gabon.
  - Felix Tijerina, 60, Mexican-American restaurateur and philanthropist in Houston, and one-time national president of the League of United Latin American Citizens (LULAC).
  - Alfred Bossom, 83, English skyscraper architect and inventor

== September 5, 1965 (Sunday) ==
- Three Iranian graduates from the Tehran University College of Engineering founded the Mujahedin-e Khalq Organization (MEK) to oppose the Western-style reforms and the political repression of the Shah. Mohammed Hanifnezhad, Said Mohsen, and Ali-Asghar Badizadegan successfully worked for the overthrow of the Shah in 1979, and the establishment of an Islamic republic, and then saw their organization would have no role under the regime of the Ayatollah Khomeini. The group would then wage its own campaign against Khomeini, with terrorist attacks against Islamic Republican Party members, and the assassination of the President and the Prime Minister.
- A battalion of the United States Marines used what it described as "tear gas" to force hidden Viet Cong guerrillas into the open in the South Vietnamese village of Vinh Quang in the Binh Dinh Province. The North Vietnamese branch of the International Red Cross, however, said that the 48 canisters were of a high concentration of phenacyl chloride or CN gas, and that 35 civilians had been killed. USMC Lt. Col. Leon N. Utter, commander of the 2nd Battalion of the 7th U.S. Marine regiment, was investigated but cleared of wrongdoing.
- The word "hippie" first appeared in print, in an article in the San Francisco Examiner by reporter Michael Fallon, who was writing a series about the Haight-Ashbury neighborhood. "Five untroubled young 'hippies'," Fallon began, "sprawled on floor mattresses and slouched in an armchair retrieved from a debris box, flipped cigaret ashes at a seatbelt in their Waller Street flat and pondered their next move."
- The 1965 UCI Road World Championships, conducted by bicycling's highest authority, the Union Cycliste Internationale, took place at Lasarte-Oria near San Sebastián in the Pyrenees mountains of Spain. There were four events, a men's road race, a women's road race, an amateur men's race, and a team time trial.
- Pravda, the newspaper of the Communist Party of the Soviet Union, published an editorial titled "Friendship of Peoples", deploring anti-Semitism. As another historian would note later, the condemnation "rested not on morality, but on the practical ground that such manifestations blacken the Soviet image abroad."
- Died: Carlos F. Borcosque, 70, cinematic director in both Chile and Argentina

== September 6, 1965 (Monday) ==
- At 3:30 in the morning local time, Indian Army troops poured across the border into the Punjab province in Pakistan, catching the Pakistani Army by surprise and opening the Indo-Pakistan War on a second front. At the same time, Pakistani aircraft bombed Indian airfields and dropped paratroopers in India's Jammu and Kashmir state, 14 miles inside the border, and threatened to drive toward New Delhi. September 6 is now honored annually as Defence Day, a public holiday to commemorate the event.
- The 11 members of the United Nations Security Council voted unanimously for Resolution 210 to direct Secretary-General U Thant to negotiate a peaceful solution to the Indo-Pakistani War. Joining the five permanent members (the United States, the Soviet Union, the United Kingdom, France, and Taiwan) were temporary members Bolivia, the Ivory Coast, Jordan, Malaysia, the Netherlands, and Uruguay.
- Born: Dana Dane (stage name for Dana McCleese), American rapper; in Fort Greene, Brooklyn

== September 7, 1965 (Tuesday) ==
- Canada's Prime Minister Lester Pearson scheduled nationwide parliamentary elections for November 8. Pearson's Liberal Party held a plurality of seats in the House of Commons, but was six short of the 133 required for a majority of the 265 available, and Pearson concluded that it was an auspicious time for the government to increase its strength.
- Twelve of the 31 men working inside an underwater caisson were killed when a decompression chamber exploded. The 31 were working on bridge pilings under the St. Lawrence River near Trois-Rivieres, Quebec.
- In a follow-up to August's Operation Starlite, United States Marines and South Vietnamese forces initiated Operation Piranha on the Batangan Peninsula, 23 miles (37 km) south of the Chu Lai Marine base.

== September 8, 1965 (Wednesday) ==
- Filipino-American members of the Agricultural Workers Organizing Committee (AWOC) labor union walked out on strike at nine of the major grape growing farms in Kern County, California, after years of being paid lower wages (as American citizens) than guest workers from Mexico. Other grievances by the predominantly Filipino-American AWOC were bad sanitary conditions, a lack of drinkable water for field workers, and brutal treatment by supervisors. Within eight days, the predominantly Mexican-American National Farm Workers Association (NFWA) would join the strike and 21 farms would be idle during the grape harvest.
- Bert Campaneris, a shortstop for baseball's Kansas City Athletics, became the first major leaguer to play all nine positions in one game. The Athletics were in last place in the ten-team American League when they hosted the Los Angeles Angels, and lost 5–3 in a game that ran into extra innings. "A surprisingly large crowd of 21,576" came to watch the experiment. The box score listed "Campy" in the order of the positions he played in the first nine of those innings: "Campaneris, ss, 2b, 3b, lf, cf, rf, 1b, p, c".
- The United States halted military aid to both India and Pakistan, in response to the Indo-Pakistan War. "Since the U.S. was the sole supplier of arms to Pakistan," an author would later note, "while India received arms from several sources, notably the USSR, the embargo was especially effective against Pakistan." Communist China sent a diplomatic note to India with the threat that if India pursued a takeover of Pakistan, there would be "grave consequences".
- The war between India and Pakistan escalated as the Indian Army sent troops toward the Pakistani capital of Karachi and toward Hyderabad, while Pakistani Air Force jets attempted to attack the Indian capital of New Delhi. The Pakistan Navy raided India's coasts without any resistance in Operation Dwarka. Pakistan now celebrates September 8 as Victory Day annually.
- Died:
  - Dorothy Dandridge, 42, American actress and singer, was found dead in her apartment in West Hollywood, California. There was no indication of foul play or a suicide, and a homicide detective told reporters that there was no indication that the death was from anything other than natural causes.
  - Hermann Staudinger, 84, German chemist and winner of the 1953 Nobel Prize in Chemistry for his discovery of the structure of polymers.

== September 9, 1965 (Thursday) ==
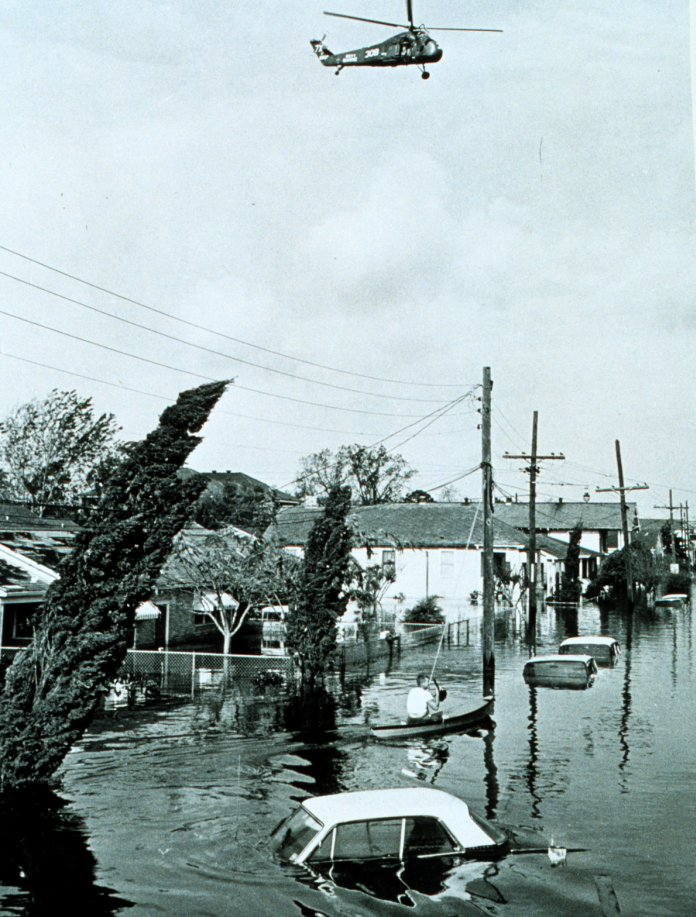
Flooding in New Orleans caused by Hurricane Betsy

- Hurricane Betsy roared ashore near New Orleans at 7:00 in the evening, with winds of 145 mph (233 km/h). Ultimately, Betsy would leave behind 76 deaths and $1.42 billion in damage in Louisiana (equivalent to $10.69 billion fifty years later). The storm was the first hurricane to cause more than one billion dollars' worth of destruction, giving it the nickname "Billion Dollar Betsy". It would be the last major hurricane to strike New Orleans until Hurricane Katrina 40 years later.
- President Ayub issued the "Enemy Property (Custody and Registration) Order II" which effectively discriminated against the Hindu minority in both West and East Pakistan by providing that India was an enemy country, that the assets and land of all Indian nationals in Pakistan were to be put under the control of the Custodian of Enemy Property, and that benefits arising from the property should not go to the enemy. Even after the termination of the national state of emergency on February 16, 1969, the law would continue.
- U.S. President Lyndon Johnson signed the legislation creating the eleventh cabinet level department in the federal executive branch, the United States Department of Housing and Urban Development, generally referred to as "HUD". Performing the duties of the former Housing and Home Finance Agency (HHFA), it was the first new cabinet department since the U. S. Department of Health, Education and Welfare had been launched in 1953. Under the legislation, HUD would not become official for 60 days.
- Baseball player Sandy Koufax of the Los Angeles Dodgers pitched a perfect game in a 1–0 win against the Chicago Cubs. It was Koufax's fourth no-hitter in as many seasons. Despite the loss, it was an impressive game for the opposing pitcher, Bob Hendley of the Cubs, who threw a one-hitter. "Don't forget the other fellow did a pretty good job out there," Koufax told reporters afterward. "That Hendley gave us only one hit and we were lucky to get the run we did."
- U.S. Navy Commander James Stockdale of the carrier USS Oriskany was captured as a prisoner of war when his F-8E jet was shot down over North Vietnam. He would spend more than seven years as a POW, and would later be awarded the Medal of Honor for his leadership of his fellow prisoners during captivity, and retire as a Vice Admiral. In 1992, he would be a candidate for Vice President of the United States as the running mate of Ross Perot.
- U.N. Secretary-General U Thant recommended the People's Republic of China for United Nations membership. Thant, however, was in Karachi to begin negotiating with Pakistan's President Ayub Khan on terms for a ceasefire, and his speech was read aloud by an assistant.
- Vatican City announced that it would no longer lend out any of its art masterpieces for exhibition. The year before, it had allowed the statue of the Pietà, carved by Michelangelo in the late 15th century, to be displayed at the 1964 New York World's Fair.
- Gemini 6 was moved to complex 19 and hoisted to the top of the Gemini rocket, eight days after being postponed by Hurricane Betsy.
- The British dredger Bowqueen capsized and sank off Clacton-on-Sea, Essex, with the loss of four of her seven crew.
- Born:
  - Constance Marie, American TV actress on the George Lopez television show; in East Los Angeles
  - Dan Majerle, American basketball player and coach; in Traverse City, Michigan

== September 10, 1965 (Friday) ==
- Typhoon Shirley swept across Japan, killing 67 people, injuring hundreds, and leaving thousands of people homeless.
- At NASA Headquarters, Saturn/Apollo Applications Deputy Director John H. Disher formally redesignated Apollo Extension System the Apollo Applications Program.
- Born: Mona Mahmudnizhad, Iranian Bahá'í martyr (d. 1983); in Shiraz
- Died:
  - "Father Divine" (born as George Baker), 89, African-American religious cult leader and founder of the International Peace Mission movement.
  - Bobby Jordan, 42, American child actor and member of the Dead End Kids and the East Side Kids, and later, as an adult, The Bowery Boys, died from cirrhosis of the liver.
  - Hans Gugelot, 45, Swiss pioneer in system design for the Braun company and at the Ulm School of Design, died from a heart attack.

== September 11, 1965 (Saturday) ==
- The Battle of Phillora, described by one military historian as "the biggest tank engagement since the Second World War", took place near the Pakistani city of Sialkot, with the Indian Army making a surprise attack with Centurion Mk7 and M4 Sherman tanks, and the Army of Pakistan defending with M47 and M48 Patton tanks. To the south, the Indian Army captured the town of Burki, only 14 miles (23 km) to the southeast of the Punjabi capital of Lahore.
- The second National Games of China opened in Beijing with 5,922 athletes from all 22 provinces and six other administrative areas, participating in 22 sports over a period of 17 days. The Games' slogan was "Exercise the Body; Build our Motherland, Defend our Country".
- College football was played in a domed stadium for the first time as the University of Tulsa Golden Hurricane beat the University of Houston Cougars, 14–0, at the Astrodome before a smaller-than-expected crowd of 37,138. A reporter at the time praised on the controlled 72° temperature in a city where it was 97° outside, but noted that the field "was almost devoid of grass" and the game was on hard ground painted green. "Football seemed strange indoors. Without mud and wind and bone-chiling cold, it certainly was a better game. But it seemed artificial— a bit too antiseptic."
- Born:
  - Paul Heyman, American pro wrestling promoter who owned and operated Extreme Championship Wrestling during the 1990s; in Scarsdale, New York
  - Bashar al-Assad, President of Syria from 2000 until his overthrow in 2024 and son of former president Hafez al-Assad; in Damascus
  - Moby (stage name for Richard Melville Hall), American musician; in Harlem, New York

== September 12, 1965 (Sunday) ==
- An American Sikorsky CH-37 Mojave helicopter, designated as a "Deuce" from its variant name as the HR-2S, became the first aircraft to lift another aircraft in a retrieval operation. The cargo was a U.S. Marine helicopter that had crashed about 15 miles from the U.S. airfield at Chu Lai in South Vietnam, and the Deuce carried the cargo back to Chu Lai.
- The first of 20,000 troops of the U.S. Army's air mobile 1st Cavalry Division of the United States Army arrived at Qui Nhon in South Vietnam, as the U.S. presence pushed toward over 100,000 servicemen.
- The 1965 Italian Grand Prix was held at Monza and was won by Jackie Stewart in 2:04:52, four seconds ahead of Graham Hill.
- Born: Einstein Kristiansen, Norwegian cartoonist, designer, and TV host; as Øistein Kristiansen in Greåker

== September 13, 1965 (Monday) ==
- Two days of voting concluded in elections in Norway as the Norwegian Labor Party (Norske Arbeiderparti) lost six seats as well as its 30 years of control of the 150-seat Storting, and Prime Minister Einar Gerhardsen was forced to yield to a coalition of four non-socialist parties. Although Labor still had a plurality of seats (68, or 43.1%), its opposition combined for 80 seats. The conservative, liberal, and moderate parties (Høyre, Venstre, and Senterpartiet, literally "right", "left", and "center") were supplemented by the Kristeleg Folkeparti (Christian People's Party) in opposition to Arbeiderparti rule. The moderate Senterpartiet leader, Per Borten, was selected as the compromise choice as the new prime minister.
- Willie Mays of the San Francisco Giants hit his 500th home run, becoming only the fifth Major League Baseball player to do so, and the first African-American to enter the "500 Club". He accomplished the feat against pitcher Don Nottebart in a 5–1 win over the host Houston Astros, and would finish the season with 52 homers and a second Most Valuable Player award from the National League. Mays would have 660 home runs at the close of his career in 1973.
- King Mwambutsa IV appointed Léopold Biha, a member of the Tutsi tribe, as the new Prime Minister of Burundi, despite a recent victory by Hutu members in the July 1965 parliamentary elections, triggering an attempted coup by the Hutus and a violent uprising.
- In Moscow, the KGB arrested Soviet dissident writers Andrei Sinyavsky and Yuli Daniel, who were charged with violations of Article 70 of the Criminal Code for anti-Soviet propaganda.
- President Fernando Belaúnde Terry appointed Daniel Becerra de la Flor as the Prime Minister of Peru, following the resignation of Fernando Schwalb López Aldana.
- Azusa Pacific College began its first classes after the merger of Azusa College with the smaller Los Angeles Pacific College.
- Canada's Governor General, George Vanier, officially opened the Toronto City Hall.
- Born: Zak Starkey, English rock drummer who appeared with The Who and Oasis, and the first child of Beatles' drummer Ringo Starr; in Hammersmith, West London
- Died: Angelo Patri, 88, Italian-born American educator and newspaper columnist

== September 14, 1965 (Tuesday) ==
- The fourth and final session of the Second Vatican Council opened with an announcement by Pope Paul VI that he would name a multinational advisory board of clergy, the Synod of Bishops, to assist him in governing the Roman Catholic Church. Marking the first time in the Church's history that it had adopted the principle of collegiality, the Pope would clarify the details the next day in a papal letter, Apostolica Sollicitudo.
- NASA contracted with the Perkin-Elmer and Chrysler corporations to study feasibility of including optical-technology experiments, particularly lasers and large telescopes, in future extended Apollo flights, as well as optical communication in deep space, the effects of space environment on optical systems, and related experiments.
- New American television shows making their premiere were the Western comedy F Troop on ABC, and the television adaptation of Jean Kerr's Please Don't Eat the Daisies, and the poorly received reincarnation fantasy comedy My Mother the Car, both on NBC.
- Born: Dmitry Medvedev, President of Russia from 2008 to 2012, and Prime Minister of Russia from 2012 to 2020; in Leningrad, Russian SFSR, Soviet Union (now Saint Petersburg, Russia)
- Died: J. W. Hearne, 74, English cricketeer who was a batsman for the England test cricket team between 1911 and 1926

== September 15, 1965 (Wednesday) ==
- Legislative elections were held in South-West Africa (now Namibia). Only 37,264 adults were eligible to vote in the South African administered population of 526,000 people; registered voters were drawn from the roughly 74,000 white people who accounted for 14% of the residents. For the fourth time since 1950, the National Party of South-West Africa won the vast majority of seats in the legislative assembly, capturing 16 of the 18 available.
- Central American University (Universidad Centroamericana or UCA) was inaugurated as the first private college in El Salvador, on Salvadoran Independence Day. It would be named for 19th Century Jesuit theologian and abolitionist José Simeón Cañas.
- Television shows that made their premiere on the same evening were rural comedy Green Acres and science fiction drama Lost in Space on CBS, spy drama I Spy on NBC, and Western drama The Big Valley on ABC.
- Died: Steve Brown, 75, American jazz musician

== September 16, 1965 (Thursday) ==
- Only 11 days after he had been appointed as the new Prime Minister of Iraq, Brigadier General Arif Abd ar-Razzaq made an unsuccessful attempt to overthrow the government of President Abdul Salam Arif while the President was in Morocco attending the Arab summit conference. The President's brother, Army Chief of Staff Abdul Rahman Arif, learned of Razzaq's intentions, and Iraqi Army troops were waiting at key locations when rebel soldiers arrived to carry out plans. According to reports, Razzaq's followers were stopped from seizing the radio station in Baghdad, where they had planned to announce the nation's merger with the Egypt-based United Arab Republic.
- U.S. Air Force Lt. Colonel Robinson Risner, described as "one of America's top heroes of the Vietnamese air war" for his heroism in an April 3 mission, was shot down over North Vietnam. Risner would spend more than seven years as a prisoner of war, frequently tortured and kept in solitary confinement, but would become a leader of his fellow POWs. He would later write of his experiences in his autobiography, The Passing of the Night: My Seven Years as a Prisoner of the North Vietnamese.
- In Delano, California, more than 1,000 members of the mostly Hispanic National Farm Workers Association met at a Catholic church hall to consider whether to join in the walkout by Philippine-American grape pickers. After hearing the call by Cesar Chavez to unite with the cause of the Agricultural Workers Organizing Committee strikers, the NFWA members voted unanimously to join in the demand for an increase of wages to $1.40 an hour.
- All five of New York City's major daily newspapers were closed down as the American Newspaper Guild called a strike against The New York Times, and union members followed suit at the New York Daily News, the New York Herald-Tribune, the New York Journal-American, and the New York World-Telegram.
- Jazz musician and composer Duke Ellington performed his first Concert of Sacred Music, realizing a dream of creating religiously-themed music "invoking God and propagating faith". The premiere took place at the Grace Cathedral in San Francisco.
- Died: Fred Quimby, 79, American animated film producer and winner of seven Academy Awards for his work on the Tom and Jerry series of short films. He died 9 days before the premiere of the Saturday morning TV cartoon series.

== September 17, 1965 (Friday) ==
- Communist China delivered an ultimatum to India, demanding that it pull its troops out of the Himalayan Kingdom of Sikkim by the end of Sunday, or face "grave consequences". One of India's envoys to Beijing received an order shortly after midnight, summoning him to China's Foreign Ministry, where a Chinese official handed him the note. At the time, Sikkim was a protectorate of India, with independence over its internal affairs, and bordered the Chinese-controlled Buddhist monarchy in Tibet.
- All 30 people on board Pan Am Flight 292 were killed when the Boeing 707 flew into the side of Chances Peak on the island of Montserrat. Traveling through a thunderstorm toward Antigua, the plane had taken off from Fort-de-France in Martinique with 21 passengers and a crew of nine en route to an eventual destination of New York City, by way of Antigua, St. Croix, and San Juan, Puerto Rico.
- The CBS television network premiered three new series, sci-fi Western The Wild Wild West, German POW camp comedy Hogan's Heroes, and the comedy variety program The Smothers Brothers Show. Of these, Hogan's Heroes would be the most successful, running for 167 episodes over six seasons.
- Stephanos Stephanopoulos was sworn in as the fourth Prime Minister of Greece in less than two months, after King Constantine II asked him to form a new government.
- Born:
  - Yuji Naka, Japanese video game designer, and co-creator of the Sonic the Hedgehog series; in Hirakata, Osaka
  - Kyle Chandler, American film and TV actor; in Buffalo, New York

== September 18, 1965 (Saturday) ==
- Comet Ikeya–Seki was first sighted, by two Japanese amateur astronomers working independently of each other. Kaoru Ikeya, a 21-year-old employee of a piano factory, was an amateur enjoying an early Saturday morning watching the skies through a homemade 8-inch reflecting telescope, while Tsutomu Seki was a 34 year old guitar instructor. Ikeya, who had discovered two comets in the past, sent a telegram to the University of Tokyo observatory, announcing that he had spotted an object moving through the area of the constellation Hydra, and Seki spotted the same object 15 minutes later.
- A team of divers, led by treasure-hunter Alex Storm, located the wreckage of the French supply ship Le Chameau, a little more than 240 years after the vessel sank in the Atlantic Ocean off of Canada's Atlantic coast. With 310 people on board and a large supply of gold and silver coins sent to pay workers in Nova Scotia, Le Chameau sank on August 27, 1725, 15 miles (24 km) off of the coast of Louisbourg. Storm and his team, who found the wreckage about 70 feet (21 m) underwater, would eventually be awarded three-fourths of the treasure by the Nova Scotia provincial courts.
- In Denmark, small-time criminal Palle Sørensen shot and killed four policemen who were pursuing him; he was apprehended the next day. Danish law changed as a result of the incident.
- John McKellar's comedy revue A Cup of Tea, a Bex and a Good Lie Down opened at the Phillip Street Theatre, Sydney, Australia.
- The NBC television network unveiled two new series, fantasy comedy I Dream of Jeannie and spy spoof Get Smart.
- Died: Marshall Field IV, 49, American publisher, owner of the Chicago Sun-Times and board chairman of the Field Enterprises syndicate of comic strips and newspaper columns, died of apparent heart failure at his home.

== September 19, 1965 (Sunday) ==
- Pakistan's President Mohammed Ayub Khan, and Foreign Minister (later Prime Minister) Zulfikar Ali Bhutto traveled secretly to the People's Republic of China to discuss the prospects of China's assistance during the war against India. According to two of Ayub Khan's confidants, China's leaders, Mao Zedong and Zhou Enlai promised military support, under the condition that Pakistan fight a prolonged war that would wear down India, even with the expectation that Pakistan's second largest city, Lahore, would come under India's control. As one historian would write later, "Ayub did not want a long war— his plan had been predicated on a quick victory— and he certainly was not willing to sacrifice Lahore," choosing instead to agree to a ceasefire four days later.
- In elections for West Germany's 518-seat Bundestag, the CDU/CSU alliance of the Christian Democrats and Christian Socialists maintained its control of the representative house of parliament, winning 47.6 percent of the vote, giving it 251 seats, and ensuring that Ludwig Erhard would remain Chancellor. The runner-up was Willy Brandt's Social Democratic Party.
- King Hussein of Jordan had his third meeting with an official of the government of Israel, at the highest level up that time between an Arab nation and the Jewish state, conferring with Foreign Minister (and future prime minister) Golda Meir.
- Soviet Premier Alexei Kosygin invited the leaders of India and Pakistan to meet in the Soviet Union to negotiate an end to their ongoing war in Kashmir.
- In its 18th season on television, The Ed Sullivan Show was broadcast in color for the first time, after 17 years in black-and-white.
- Born:
  - Tim Scott, African-American Republican politician, U.S. Congressman 2009 to 2013, and U.S. Senator for South Carolina since 2013; in North Charleston, South Carolina
  - Sunita Pandya Williams, American astronaut on five missions, known for spending more time in outer space (321 days) than any other woman; in Euclid, Ohio
  - Tshering Tobgay, Prime Minister of Bhutan from 2013 to 2018, and again since 2024; to Bhutanese parents in Kalimpong, West Bengal state, India
  - Sabine Paturel, French pop music singer; in Toulon
- Died: Balwantrai Mehta, 66, Chief Minister of Gujarat state in India since 1963, was killed along with his wife, three staff members, a reporter, and two pilots when the plane that he was flying in was shot down by a Pakistan Air Force pilot.

== September 20, 1965 (Monday) ==
- Two Shenyang J-6 jet fighters from China's People's Liberation Army Air Force shot down an American F-104C Starfighter and captured its pilot, USAF Captain Philip E. Smith, when Smith strayed over the mainland in the Guangdong Province's Leizhou Peninsula after flying over China's island Hainan Province. A U.S. spokesman said that Smith had radioed that he had been having difficulty with his navigational equipment prior to ejecting. Captain Smith would spend more than seven years in solitary confinement in a Chinese prison until being released along with North Vietnamese prisoners of war in 1973.
- In the United Nations Security Council, the Soviet Union and the United States joined the three other permanent members in unanimous approval of Resolution 211, demanding that India and Pakistan begin a cease-fire no later than 0700 hours UTC on September 22 (noon in Pakistan and 12:30 p.m. in India), and to withdraw their troops back to the locations where they had been prior to August 5. Unlike two resolutions earlier in the month, the UN directive would be agreed to by both warring parties.
- Manned Spacecraft Center announced that Neil A. Armstrong would be command pilot and David R. Scott would be pilot for Gemini 8. The backup crew would be Charles Conrad, Jr., and Richard F. Gordon, Jr. Gemini 8 was planned to include practice on rendezvous and docking maneuvers and a space walk that could last as long as one Earth orbit, about 95 minutes.

== September 21, 1965 (Tuesday) ==
- Ismail Nasiruddin of Terengganu, the Sultan of Terengganu, became the new Head of State for Malaysia, under the unique system where one of the sultans of the constituent states of Malaysia serves a five-year term as the nation's monarch, the Yang di-Pertuan Agong.
- Singapore, which had separated from Malaysia only six weeks earlier, became one of the three new members of the United Nations, bringing the number of member nations to 117. The other two nations were the Gambia and the Maldives.
- The bishops assembled at the Second Vatican Council voted 1,997 to 224 to approve the proposed Declaration on Religious Freedom.
- Born:
  - Darva Conger, former emergency department nurse who in 2000 was selected as the winner of the reality television show Who Wants to Marry a Multi-Millionaire?; in Carbondale, Illinois
  - Johanna Vuoksenmaa, Finnish film director and screenwriter; in Hämeenlinna
  - Cheryl Hines, American actress and comedian; in Miami Beach, Florida

== September 22, 1965 (Wednesday) ==
- At 2:00 in the morning in New York, Pakistan Foreign Minister Zulfikar Ali Bhutto appeared before the United Nations Security Council and read a statement from President Ayub Khan, reluctantly agreeing to a ceasefire in the war with India over Kashmir. Bhutto, who had flown from London, demanded that the UN oversee a plebiscite in both the Pakistani and Indian occupied Kashmir territory so that the predominantly Muslim population could vote on which nation to join, and said that Pakistan was prepared to withdraw from the international organization if a solution was not reached. "Kashmir is more a part of Pakistan than India," he said in a speech, "in people, in blood, flesh and life, in culture and in history. We are fighting a war imposed upon us by India."
- United Air Lines Flight 881 was arriving in Des Moines, Iowa from Chicago when its front windshield was shattered in a bird strike that injured the pilot, the co-pilot, and the flight engineer, sending all three men to the hospital. The four-engine DC-6 apparently collided with a large hawk at about 10:40 p.m., ten miles from the runway, knocking a 12-inch by 6-inch hole in the window, and the cabin quickly depressurized, but the crew was able to bring the 69 passengers in for a safe landing.
- Radio Peking announced that Indian troops had dismantled their equipment on the Chinese side of the border. However, a spokesman for the Indian government told the Reuters news agency that India never had anything to dismantle, saying "We have not crossed into Tibet and we have not torn down anything."
- U.S. President Johnson signed the Law Enforcement Assistance Act of 1965 into law, signalling the beginning of his administration's declared "War on Crime". The legislation had been approved unanimously by both the House of Representatives on August 2 (326–0) and by the Senate on a voice vote.
- The U.S. Senate voted, 76 to 18, to approve the Hart-Celler Act, a major reform in the American law on immigration. A different version of the legislation, which increased the diversity of the incoming population of immigrants to the U.S., had passed the House of Representatives on August 25, 318–95.
- Richard Casey, known officially as Lord Casey of Berwick, became the first native Australian to become Governor-General of Australia, as the Viscount De L'Isle (William P. Sidney) retired.

== September 23, 1965 (Thursday) ==
- Hostilities in the Indo-Pakistani War of 1965 ceased at 3:00 in the morning on the Pakistani side of Kashmir (3:30 Indian time), as ordered by the United Nations Security Council, 15 hours later than the original UN deadline. Both nations had agreed to accept the ceasefire, but both asserted that instead of 0700 UTC on the 22nd, they would need until 2200 UTC to relay communications to all units in the field. During the additional hours, Pakistani war planes bombed the holy city of Amritsar in India, location of the Golden Temple of the Sikh religious faith, killing 42 civilians.
- Dr. Yusuf Zuayyin, a physician who had attended medical school in London, was appointed as the new Prime Minister of Syria. He would serve less than three months, and resign on December 21.
- Born: Aleqa Hammond, the first female Prime Minister of Greenland, serving from 2013 to 2014; in Narsaq

== September 24, 1965 (Friday) ==
- U.S. President Johnson announced that the United States had agreed to relinquish its exclusive control of the Panama Canal and to share administration of the canal with Panama. In 1903, shortly after the Republic of Panama had been created by an American-supported secessionist movement that set the territory apart from Colombia, the new Panamanian government had signed a treaty granting the U.S. "all rights, power, and authority" over a 533 square mile area, the Panama Canal Zone, "in perpetuity". Johnson pledged to replace the 62-year old treaty, although an agreement would not be approved until 1979.
- President Johnson also issued Executive Order 11246, prohibiting all employment discrimination by federal contractors and all federally-assisted construction contractors and subcontractors doing more than $10,000 of work for the U.S. government in the past year, on the basis of race, color, religion, or national origin. The order would be amended in 1967 to also prohibit discrimination on the basis of gender.
- Responding to the proposed nuclear non-proliferation treaty submitted by the United States on August 17, the Soviet Union presented its own version to the United Nations.

== September 25, 1965 (Saturday) ==
- At the age of 59, Satchel Paige became the oldest Major League Baseball player to appear in a game, pitching three innings for the Kansas City Athletics against the visiting Boston Red Sox, and allowing only one hit. Paige, who had starred for the Kansas City Monarchs in the Negro American League before baseball's color ban had been lifted in 1947, had been away from the majors for 12 years before being signed to a one-game contract by Athletics' owner Charles O. Finley. With the A's leading 1–0, Paige yielded to Diego Segui, and the Sox won the game, 5–2.
- The Tom and Jerry cartoon series, formerly a staple of short films, made its television debut on the CBS Saturday morning schedule. On the same day, ABC capitalized on the popularity of "The Fab Four" with a cartoon, The Beatles. Each episode featured one of the Beatles songs and a story built around it; in the stories, British comedian Lance Percival mimicked the voices of Paul McCartney and Ringo Starr, while American voice actor Paul Frees spoke for John Lennon and George Harrison.
- The Parliament of Greece finally gave approval to a new prime minister, as the new government of Stephanos Stephanopoulos narrowly survived a vote of confidence, 152 to 148. Stephanopoulos had been the third choice of King Constantine II since the July 15 resignation of Giorgios Papandreou, after the first two successors had been rejected. Support came after eight additional legislators from Papandreou‘s Center Union Party agreed to vote for the new cabinet.
- Beat-Club, a West German music programme, first broadcast on ARD's national public TV channel, Erstes Deutsches Fernsehen. The programme featured famous music artists such as Jimi Hendrix, Alice Cooper, The Rolling Stones, and The Who (to name a few) during its seven-year run. The programme was replaced by Musikladen in 1972, a continuation of Beat-Club under a new name.
- Born: Scottie Pippen, American NBA star for 16 seasons, member of Basketball Hall of Fame and two time Olympic gold medalist; in Hamburg, Arkansas
- Died: David Lowe, 52, American investigative journalist and television documentary producer best known for his exposés on CBS Reports, including the 1960 report on the low wages of migrant farm workers, "Harvest of Shame". Lowe, whose Peabody Award-winning report, "KKK— The Invisible Empire", had aired only two nights earlier, suffered a fatal heart attack while at the Friars Club in New York City.

== September 26, 1965 (Sunday) ==
- On his 68th birthday, Pope Paul VI celebrated Mass before 4,000 Roman Catholic members of Italy's Romani community, who had made an unprecedented pilgrimage toward Rome and gathered in the city of Pomezia, setting up a camp despite a heavy downpour. The Pope told the wandering group that the Roman Catholic Church welcomed them, saying, "Your place is right in the heart of the church, not on her edges, because you are alone, you are poor and needy of assistance, of instruction, and of aid. The church loves the poor, the sick, the destitute and the neglected."
- The British governor of Aden, Sir Richard Turnbull, canceled the constitution and took direct control of the protectorate in Yemen.
- The Minnesota Twins clinched their first American League pennant. Ironically, the game that guaranteed their first-place finish took place in Washington, where they had played as the original Washington Senators until 1960, and their opponents were the new Washington Senators (who would become the Texas Rangers in 1972), whom they defeated, 2–1.
- The Soviet cruise ship Nadezhda Krupskaya ran aground off Stockholm, Sweden. All 94 passengers were returned home after a Soviet tugboat was called in to pull the ship out of Swedish territory.
- Born:
  - Petro Poroshenko, 5th President of Ukraine from 2014 to 2019; in Bolhrad, Ukrainian SSR, Soviet Union
  - Alexandra Lencastre, Portuguese actress; in Lisbon
- Died:
  - U.S. Army Captain Humbert Roque "Rocky" Versace, 28, and U.S. Army Master Sergeant Kenneth M. Roraback, 33, were executed by the Viet Cong. According to a broadcast by Radio Hanoi, the two men, both of whom had been held prisoner since 1963, were killed in reprisal for the execution of three Communist sympathizers in South Vietnam. Captain Versace would be posthumously awarded the Medal of Honor on July 8, 2002.
  - James Fitzmaurice, 67, Irish aviator and co-pilot (in 1928) of the Bremen, the first airplane to cross the Atlantic Ocean from east to west, slightly less than one year after Charles Lindbergh's west to east crossing.

== September 27, 1965 (Monday) ==
- The world's largest tanker ship at the time, the 150,000-tonne (150,000-long-ton; 170,000-short-ton) Tokyo Maru, was launched in Yokohama, Japan. The ship was 306.5 meters (1,006 ft) long and 47.5 meters (156 ft) wide, and designed to carry 150,000 tons of oil.
- The A-7 Corsair II, a light attack jet aircraft manufactured by LTV, made its first flight.
- Born:
  - Peter MacKay, Canadian government official who served as Foreign Minister, National Defence Minister, and Attorney General of Canada in the cabinet of Prime Minister Stephen Harper between 2006 and 2015; in New Glasgow, Nova Scotia
  - Steve Kerr, American NBA head coach and player; in Beirut, Lebanon

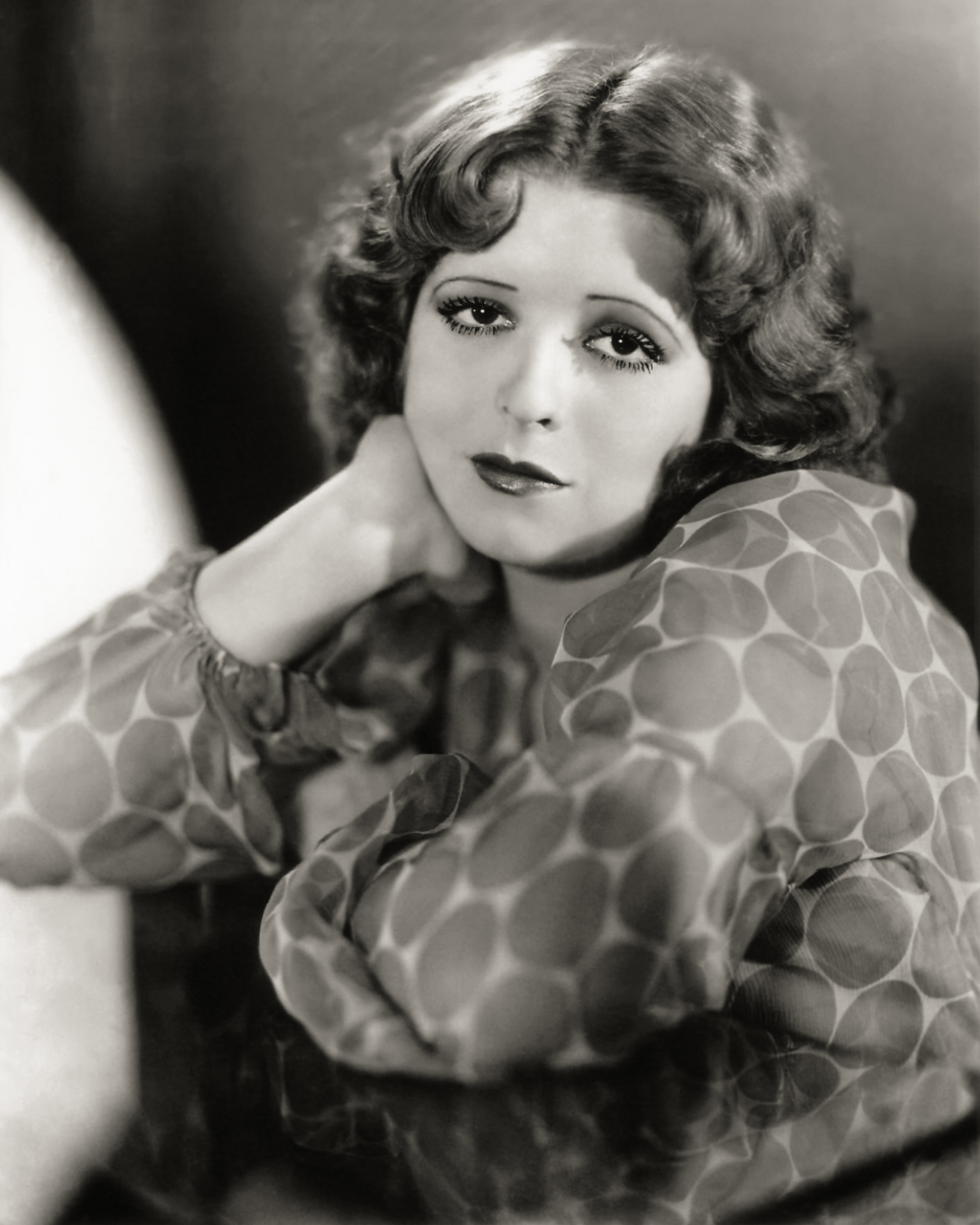
Clara Bow

- Died:
  - Clara Bow, 60, American silent film star known as "The 'It' Girl", based on a popular slang term in the early 20th century for an undefinable feminine quality of sex appeal where a woman was said to have "it" and her leading role in the 1927 film It.
  - Sir William Stanier, 89, English steam locomotive designer

== September 28, 1965 (Tuesday) ==
- The Central Committee of the Communist Party of the Soviet Union announced drastic changes in the nation's industry, including using the measurement of profitability and saleability as the new indicators of successful production, rather than the number of units being produced in a particular period. The announcement from the official news agency, TASS, also outlined plans to provide incentives to individual workers for increased production, more authority to local plant managers to make independent decisions on factory operation, and a more accurate system of calculating prices set by the state for consumer goods. Premier Alexei Kosygin conceded that there were "certain difficulties in the advance of our economy" and that there had been "errors in planning", and urged that businesses "should retain from their profits more funds for the development of production" as well as reforming "absolutely insufficient" worker incentives. Referring to capitalism, Kosygin said, "Our foes will, of course, seek to distort the essence of these decisions," but added that the reforms "will strengthen the position of socialism in the economic competition between the two different systems."
- Cuba's Premier Fidel Castro announced that anyone who wished to do so was free to emigrate to the United States and that he would provide the transportation. Castro made the announcement in a speech at Havana's Revolutionary Square, broadcast nationally on radio and television, saying, "We are not going to force people to like our revolution and our socialism, nor do we have any reason to do so", but elaborated that people seeking to leave would have to write a letter to the Ministry of the Interior to ask for a permit before they could depart. The small port of Camarioca, in the Matanzas Province near Varadero, was the point of departure. The first boat would depart Camarioca on October 10, and watercraft would depart from Florida toward Cuba on the same day, with 4,993 people leaving over the next two months. On December 1, air transportation would begin from the Varadero airport, and ten flights a week would take place for the next seven and a half years, until the ports were closed on April 6, 1973. During the period that Cubans were permitted to emigrate, 297,318 would travel to the U.S. by air.
- Around 2:00 in the morning local time, the Taal Volcano erupted on a small island within the Luzon province in the Philippines, killing at least 589 island residents. Philippine national police would report on October 1 that they had recovered the bodies of 589 people, but another 2,000 people would still be listed as missing more than two weeks after the disaster.
- Dr. Sol Spiegelman, a molecular biologist at the University of Illinois, announced that he had successfully created the first synthetic life from a genetic code and chemicals, duplicating a self-replicating virus from the RNA of the original virus.
- Nine crewmen on the British garbage scow Sir Joseph Rawlinson died when the vessel sank after a collision with a hopper barge on the Thames River near Gravesend. Another ten were rescued by the tug Danube VIII. The ship would be raised in the following year.
- Carpinteria, California, was incorporated as a city.
- Born: Scott Fellows, American children's television producer and creator of Johnny Test and Ned's Declassified School Survival Guide; in New Haven, Connecticut
- Died: Sándor Rónai, 72, President of Hungary from 1950 to 1952

== September 29, 1965 (Wednesday) ==
- The U.S. House of Representatives went against President Johnson for the first time since the 1964 Congressional elections had given Johnson's Democratic Party a substantial majority and rejected a bill to allow residents of Washington, D.C., to elect their own mayor and city council. Under the law at that time, the District of Columbia was not permitted any measure of "home rule", and Congress handled the functions of passing ordinances and administering local law. The Johnson-favored resolution did not leave the House Subcommittee for District of Columbia Affairs, and a substitute resolution, with a lengthy process involving multiple steps, was approved by the House, 198 to 139. The bill introduced by Representative B. F. Sisk of California would provide for a referendum on whether to elect a "charter board" to draw up a proposed charter for a plan to govern the District and the City, a second referendum on whether to approve the proposed charters, and, if the two referendums were successful, a vote in both houses of Congress on whether to approve or reject the plans as written by the charter board.
- President Johnson signed the National Foundation on the Arts and Humanities Act into law, creating the federally funded National Endowment for the Arts and the National Endowment for the Humanities. Johnson commented at the ceremony, "In the long history of man, countless empires and nations have come and gone. Those which created no lasting works of art are reduced today to short footnotes in history's catalog. Art is a nation's most precious heritage, for it is in our works of art that we reveal to ourselves, and to others, the inner vision which guides us as a nation. We in America have not always been kind to the artists and scholars who are the creators and the keepers of our vision. Somehow, the scientists always seem to get the penthouse, while the arts and the humanities get the basement." He closed by saying that the new law would "bring active support to this great national asset, to make fresher the winds of art in this great land of ours. The arts and humanities belong to the people, for it is, after all, the people who created them."
- The Central Committee of China's Communist Party issued a statement in its official newspaper, Red Flag, saying that 16 years after the 1949 revolution, class struggle and inequality of income still existed in the People's Republic and that it "at times is very acute". While the initial impression in the West was that it was an admission that the Communist revolution had not been as successful as the Party had claimed, the statement was a precursor to the Cultural Revolution that would begin in the year ahead.
- Zakaria Mohieddin, Gamel Abdel Nasser's Vice-President since 1961, was named as the new Prime Minister of Egypt, as President Nasser replaced the pro-Soviet Ali Sabri with a pro-American successor.

== September 30, 1965 (Thursday) ==
- A group of officers from the Indonesian Air Force and from President Sukarno's personal bodyguard, the Tjakrabirawa Regiment proclaimed what they called the 30 September Movement, setting off from Halim Air Force Base in East Jakarta to kidnap seven of the Indonesian Army's top generals. "It is not clear whether they originally intended to kill them," a historian would later write, "but that was the result of their actions." The 30 September group, linked to the Indonesian Communist Party (PKI), is referred to in Indonesian history texts now as Gestapu for (Gerakan September Tiga Puluh, tiga puluh being Indonesian for "30", and gerakan for a political movement), and as G30S/PKI. After the coup was suppressed the next day by the Indonesian Army, Sukarno would gradually be deprived of power, Army General Suharto would become the populous nation's de facto leader, and reprisals would begin against PKI members and sympathizers, with the murder of as many as 300,000 suspected dissidents. More than 6,000 people who had been arrested and charged with participation in the coup would be held in a prison on the island of Buru for the next 14 years.
- U.S. Secretary of Defense Robert S. McNamara announced that a two billion dollar defense contract had been awarded to the Lockheed Corporation of the construction of a fleet of 58 Lockheed C-5A Galaxy cargo jet planes, each capable of transporting 600 troops or 100,000 pounds of supplies nonstop across the Pacific Ocean. The C5-A was the largest jet transport plane built to that time.
- Voters in Tanzania overwhelmingly voted in favor of allowing President Julius Nyerere an additional five years term. Nyerere, who had gotten 97% of the vote in a multi-candidate election in 1962, was the only candidate on the ballot in 1965, and received 2,519,855 "yes" votes, and 92,359 "no" votes.
- Both houses of the U.S. Congress passed the joint compromise bill on immigration reform, with the House approving the new version 320 to 69, and the Senate approving by voice vote.
- The classic British family sci-fi show Thunderbirds, using the "Supermarionation" process created by Gerry Anderson and Sylvia Anderson, made its debut on the ITV television network.
- British singer Donovan (Donovan Philips Leitch) made his American debut, appearing on the ABC show Shindig!. He performed Buffy Sainte-Marie's song, "Universal Soldier".
- Born: Omid Djalili, British comedian, in Kensington, London
