= Leonard Marks =

American lawyer

Leonard Harold Marks (b. Mar 5, 1916 Pittsburgh, Pennsylvania; d. Aug. 11, 2006 Washington, DC) was a director of the United States Information Agency.

He graduated from the University of Pittsburgh. He first worked with the Office of Price Administration, then in 1942 for the Federal Communications Commission before going into the private practice of law in 1946. His firm (Cohn and Marks) specialized in communications law, and Lady Bird Johnson's chain of TV stations were one of his clients.

In 1965 he was named director of the United States Information Agency by President Lyndon Johnson.

In December 1967 Secretary of State Dean Rusk and US President Lyndon Johnson discussed Marks as a possible appointment to the United Nations as US Ambassador.

He was a member of the National Security Council during the Vietnam War. During the Carter administration he was president of Radio Free Europe/Radio Liberty.

== Writings ==
- The President is Calling (memoir, 2004)

== Personal life ==
He married Dorothy Ames around 1947 and had two sons, Stephen A. Marks and Robert E. Marks. He died of Parkinson's disease.
