= 1961 South West African parliamentary election =

Parliamentary elections were held in South West Africa on 8 March 1961. The whites-only election saw a victory for the National Party of South West Africa, which won 16 of the 18 seats in the Legislative Assembly, maintaining exactly the number of seats it had won in the previous election. The 1961 polls marked the last time during the apartheid era that any other party won seats.

== Electoral system ==
The 18 members of the Legislative Assembly were elected from single-member constituencies. Prior to the elections two constituencies (Outjo and Rehoboth) were abolished and replaced by Tsumeb and Windhoek District. The other constituencies were Aroab, Gobabis, Grootfontein, Keetmanshoop, Luderitz, Maltahöhe, Mariental, Okahandja, Otjikondo, Otjiwarongo, Swakopmund, Usakos, Warmbad, Windhoek East, Windhoek North and Windhoek West.

== Results ==
Party	Votes	%	Seats	+/–
National Party of South West Africa	19,360	59.43	16	0
United National South West Party	11,314	34.73	2	0
South West Party	1,902	5.84	0	New
Total	32,576	100.00	18	0
Registered voters/turnout	38,540	–		
Source: Ngavirue
