= Neckartal Dam =

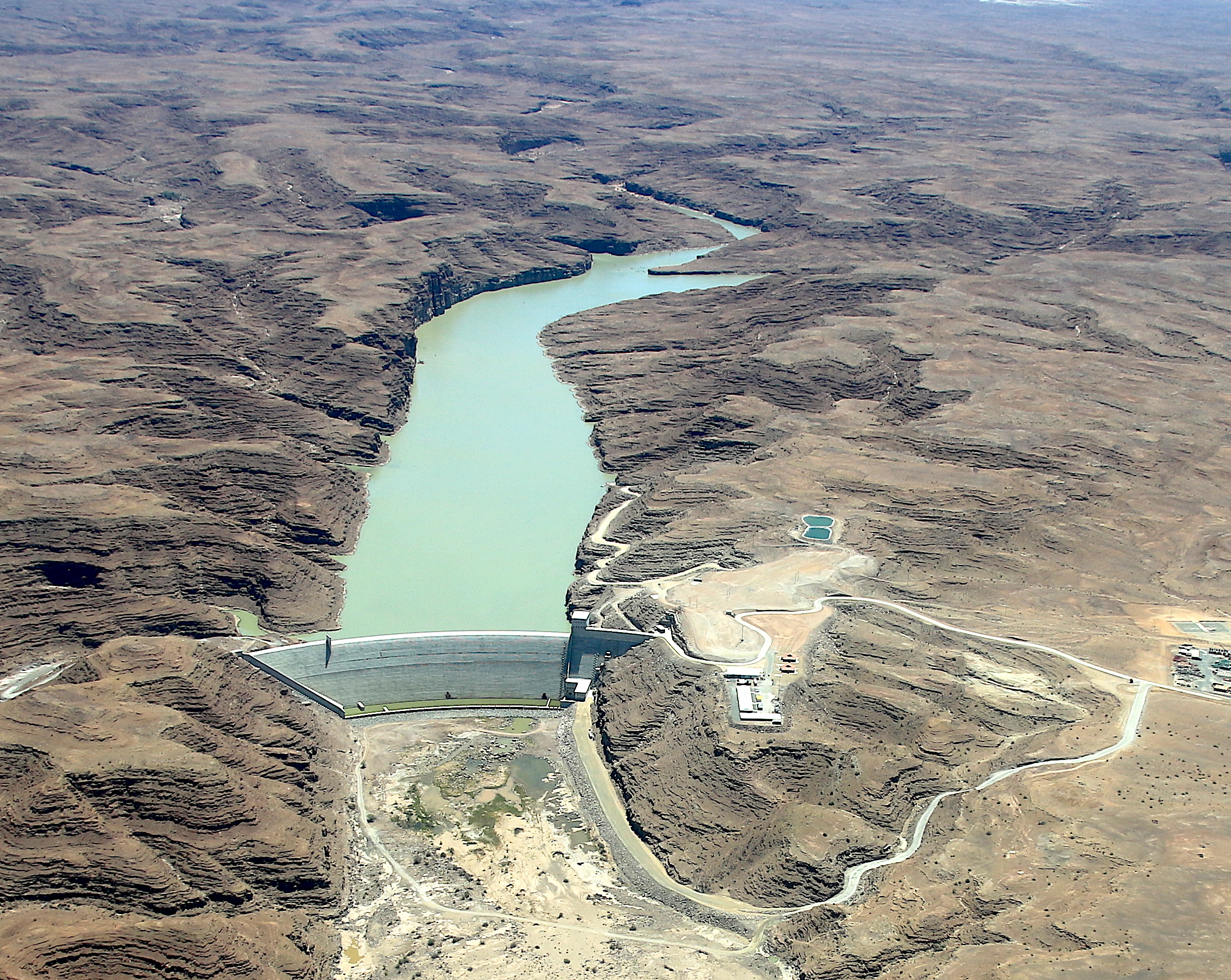
- Aerial view of Neckartal Dam (2019)

- Location within Namibia
- Country: Namibia
- Location: Berseba, ǁKaras Region
- Coordinates: 26°37′55″S 017°43′04″E
- Construction began: 2013
- Opening date: October 2019
- Construction cost: 5.7 billion N$
- Owner: NamWater

Dam and spillways
- Type of dam: Curved gravity dam
- Impounds: Fish River
- Height: 80 m (260 ft)
- Length: 518 m (1,699 ft)

Reservoir
- Total capacity: 880×10^{6} m^{3} (1.15×10^{9} cu yd)
- Catchment area: 45,365 km^{2} (4,536,500 ha)
- Surface area: 25 km^{2} (2,500 ha)

Power Station
- Turbines: 2 x Francis turbines, 1.5 MW each
- Installed capacity: 3 MW

The Neckartal Dam, nicknamed the Desert Dragon, is a dam in the Berseba Constituency of Namibia's southern ǁKaras Region. It is a curved gravity dam on the Fish River near Berseba, c. 40 kilometres (25 mi) northwest of the regional capital Keetmanshoop. Construction started in 2013 and was initially expected to finish in 2017. Since its completion in 2018, it is the largest dam in Namibia, more than three times the capacity of the Hardap Dam upstream. The dam's purpose is to support a 5,000 hectares (12,000 acres) irrigation scheme which has yet to be established.

== Construction ==
The idea to construct a dam near Keetmanshoop already came up during the era of German colonialisation. Upon Namibian independence in 1990, the planning slowly came into motion. Although hailed as a promising job creation project, particularly after commission due to the purpose as an irrigation dam, there were doubts over the necessity to build it. Naute Dam in the same area, likewise an irrigation dam, is under-utilised. However, for an irrigation scheme of 5,000 hectares (12,000 acres) as envisaged for the Neckartal Dam, Naute Dam was deemed too small.

NamWater commissioned the dam. In March 2013 Italian company Salini Impregilo was awarded the 2.8 billion N$ tender, at that time the largest in Namibia's history, to build the dam. After a legal challenge by one competitor, the tender was withdrawn but re-awarded to the same company in August 2013. Construction started within a month. Originally planned to take 3 years, the project has been delayed by the court case and labour unrest. The legal delays also increased the price by 600 million N$.

Its completion occurred in October 2018, by then the cost had risen to 5.7 billion N$. The filling-up phase was expected to last at least another two years. The dam overflowed for the first time on 19 January 2021 after an exceptionally good rainy season.

Stage 2 of the dam project, involving the laying of pipes and digging of canals for the suggested irrigation projects, has not yet started despite the dam being fully functional.

== Usage ==
The dam's purpose is to support a 5,000 hectares (12,000 acres) irrigation scheme which has yet to be established. Additional investments of between 2.4 and 3.9 billion N$ will be necessary before the irrigation project can start, such that thus far from the investment of about 2/3 of Namibia's GDP there was "not a dollar earned".

Residents of the nearby upstream settlement of Snyfontein have for a long time fished in the intermittent streams dammed by Neckartal. The dam construction provided new opportunities to catch and process fish.

== Building process ==
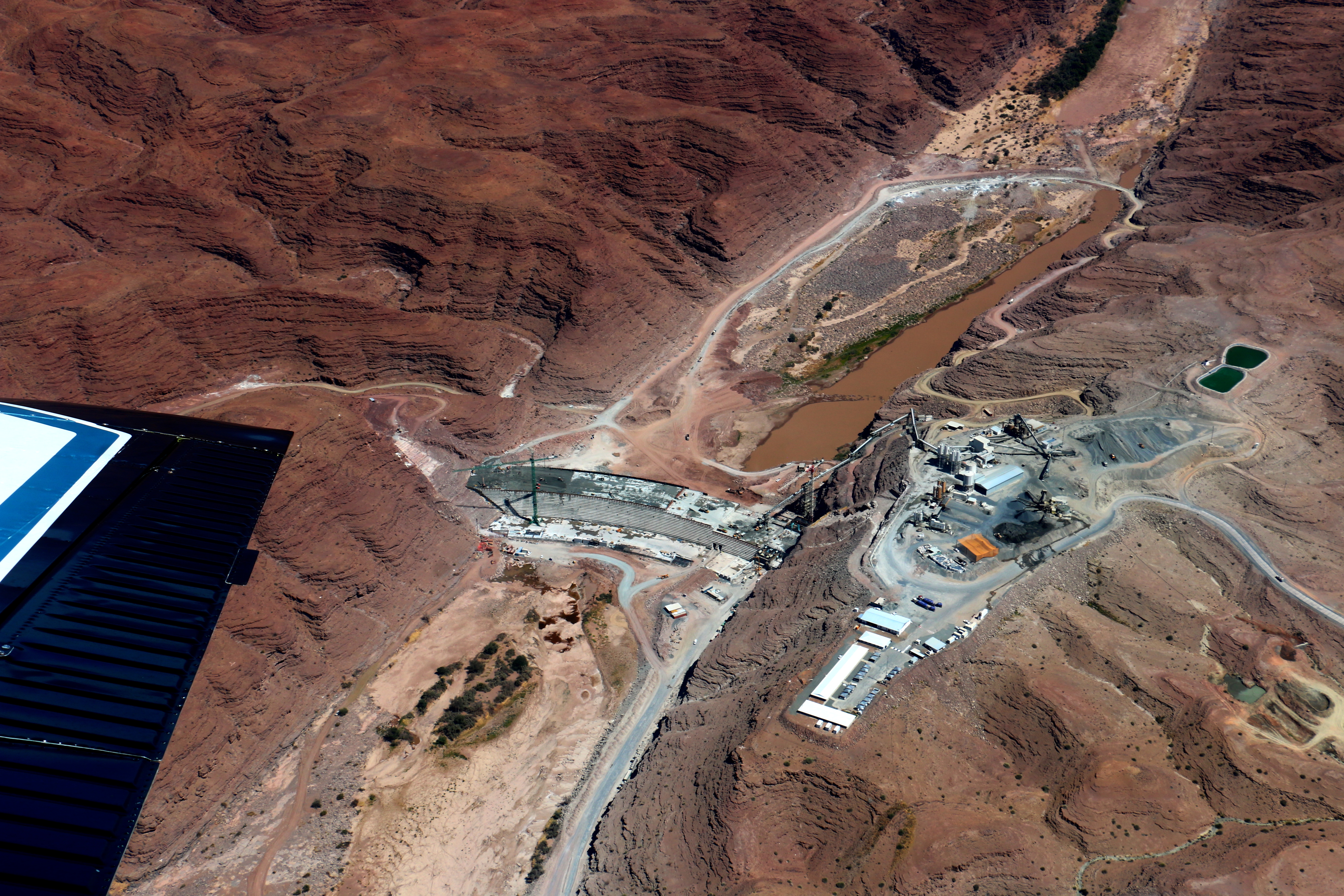
Aerial view of Neckartal Dam under construction in October 2016

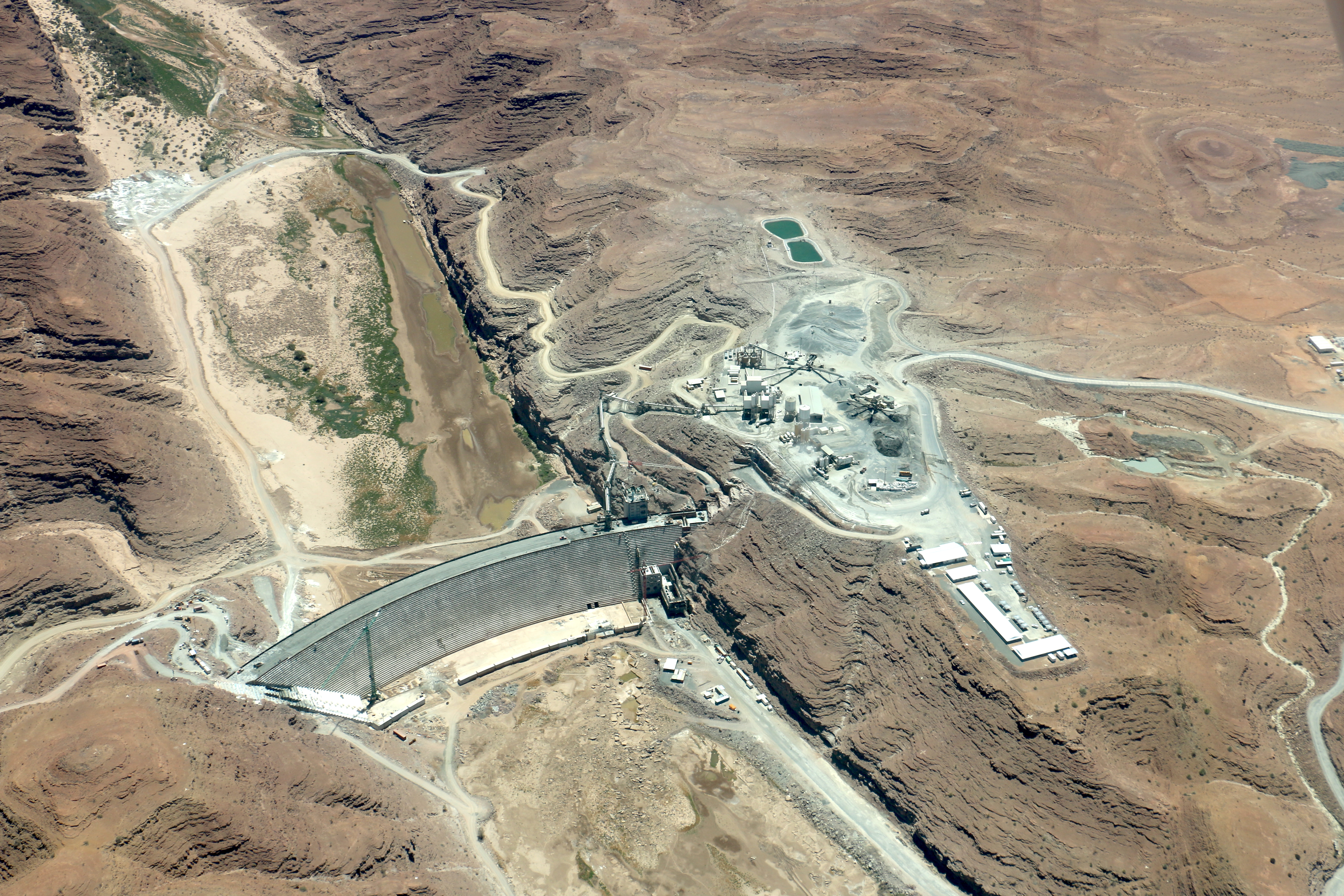
Aerial view of Neckartal Dam under construction in October 2017

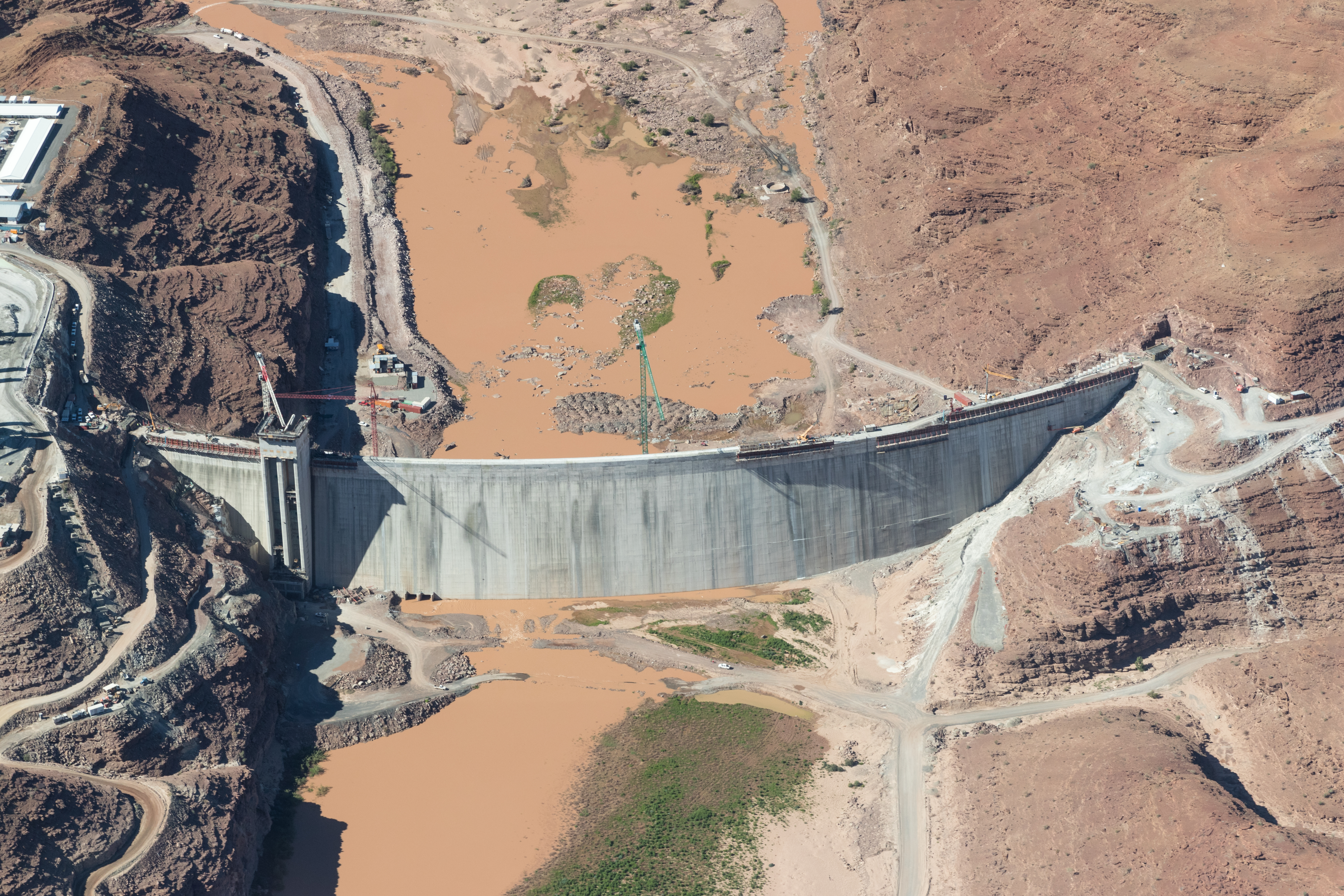
Neckartal Dam near completion April 2018
