= 1955 South West African parliamentary election =

Parliamentary elections were held in South West Africa on 16 November 1955. The whites-only election again saw victory and an overwhelming majority for the National Party of South West Africa, which won 16 of the 18 seats in the Legislative Assembly.

== Electoral system ==
The 18 members of the Legislative Assembly were elected from single-member constituencies: Aroab, Gobabis, Grootfontein, Keetmanshoop, Luderitz, Maltahöhe, Mariental, Okahandja, Otjikondo, Otjiwarongo, Outjo, Rehoboth, Swakopmund, Usakos, Warmbad, Windhoek East, Windhoek North and Windhoek West.

== Results ==
Party	Votes	%	Seats	+/–
National Party of South West Africa	15,484	58.83	16	+1
United National South West Party	10,735	40.79	2	–1
Economic Party	100	0.38	0	New
Total	26,319	100.00	18	0
Registered voters/turnout	29,773	–		
Source: Ngavirue
