= 1965 South West African parliamentary election =

Parliamentary elections were held in South West Africa on 15 September 1965. The whites-only election saw a victory for the National Party of South West Africa, which won all 18 seats in the Legislative Assembly. From this election onwards, no other party won even a single seat of the Legislative Assembly during the apartheid era.

== Electoral system ==
The 18 members of the Legislative Assembly were elected from single-member constituencies. Prior to the elections six constituencies (Aroab, Mariental, Otjikondo, Usakos, Windhoek District and Windhoek North) were abolished and replaced by Erongo, Khomas-hochland, Stampriet, Walvisbay, Windhoek Klein and Windhoek South. The other constituencies were Gobabis, Grootfontein, Keetmanshoop, Luderitz, Maltahöhe, Okahandja, Otjiwarongo, Swakopmund, Tsumeb, Warmbad, Windhoek East and Windhoek West.

== Results ==
Party	Votes	%	Seats	+/–
National Party of South West Africa	21,240	67.80	18	+2
United National South West Party	10,087	32.20	0	–2
Total	31,327	100.00	18	0
Registered voters/turnout	38,479	–		
Source: Ngavirue
