= Economic League =

The Economic League can refer to more than one organisation:

- Economic League (Netherlands), a minor Dutch political party.
- Economic League (South-West Africa), a minor South-West African political party.
- Economic League (United Kingdom), a British advocacy group.
