= Snyfontein =

Settlement in Namibia's southern ǁKaras Region

Coordinates: 26°27′S 17°49′E

Snyfontein is a settlement situated 35 kilometres (22 mi) northwest of Keetmanshoop in the ǁKaras Region of Namibia. Snyfontein is located near the Neckartal Dam on the Kameel River, one of the tributaries of the Fish River that is dammed by Neckartal. It has about 1,000 inhabitants and belongs to the electoral constituency of Berseba.

The people of this settlement mainly depend on subsistence farming and state welfare. Residents have for a long time fished in the intermittent streams nearby. In the wake of the dam construction, they have formed the Snyfontein Small-Scale Fishing Organisation (SSFO) in order to utilise the opportunities provided by the dam.
