= 1950 South West African parliamentary election =

Parliamentary elections were held in South West Africa on 30 August 1950. The whites-only election saw a victory for the National Party of South West Africa, which won 15 of the 18 seats in the Legislative Assembly.

== Electoral system ==
Prior to the1950 elections, the electoral system was reformed; previously 12 of the 18 members of the Legislative Assembly were elected from single-member constituencies and six members were appointed by the Administrator. Under the new system, all 18 members were elected in single-member constituencies. Four constituencies (Gibeon, Stampriet, Windhoek Central and Windhoek District) were abolished, leaving the new constituencies as Aroab, Gobabis, Grootfontein, Keetmanshoop, Luderitz, Maltahöhe, Mariental, Okahandja, Otjikondo, Otjiwarongo, Outjo, Rehoboth, Swakopmund, Usakos, Warmbad, Windhoek East, Windhoek North and Windhoek West.

== Results ==
Party	Votes	%	Seats	+/–
National Party of South West Africa	12,349	55.14	15	+15
United National South West Party	10,048	44.86	3	–9
Total	22,397	100.00	18	0
Registered voters/turnout	23,934	–		
Source: Ngavirue
