= Naute Dam =

Dam in Namibia

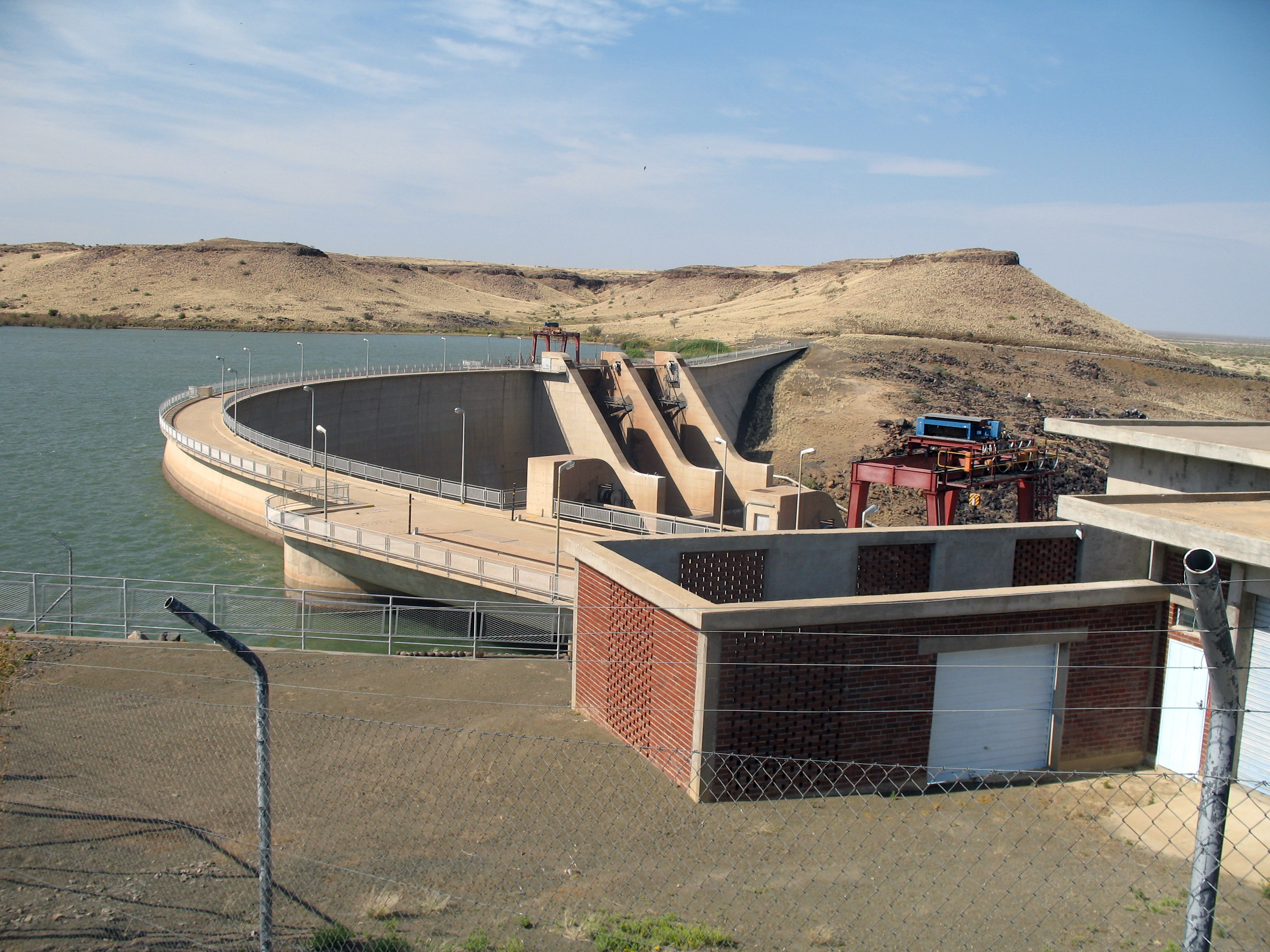
- Interactive map of Naute Dam
- Country: Namibia
- Location: Outside Keetmanshoop, Karas Region
- Coordinates: 26.931°S 17.938°E
- Purpose: Potable water supply, irrigation, fish farming, fruit farming
- Status: Operational
- Construction began: 1970
- Opening date: September 1972
- Built by: Concor

Dam and spillways
- Impounds: Löwen River

Reservoir
- Creates: Naute Dam Reservoir
- Total capacity: 69,000,000 m3
- Catchment area: Löwen River

Naute Aqua Fish Farms Project, Naute Fruit Farm

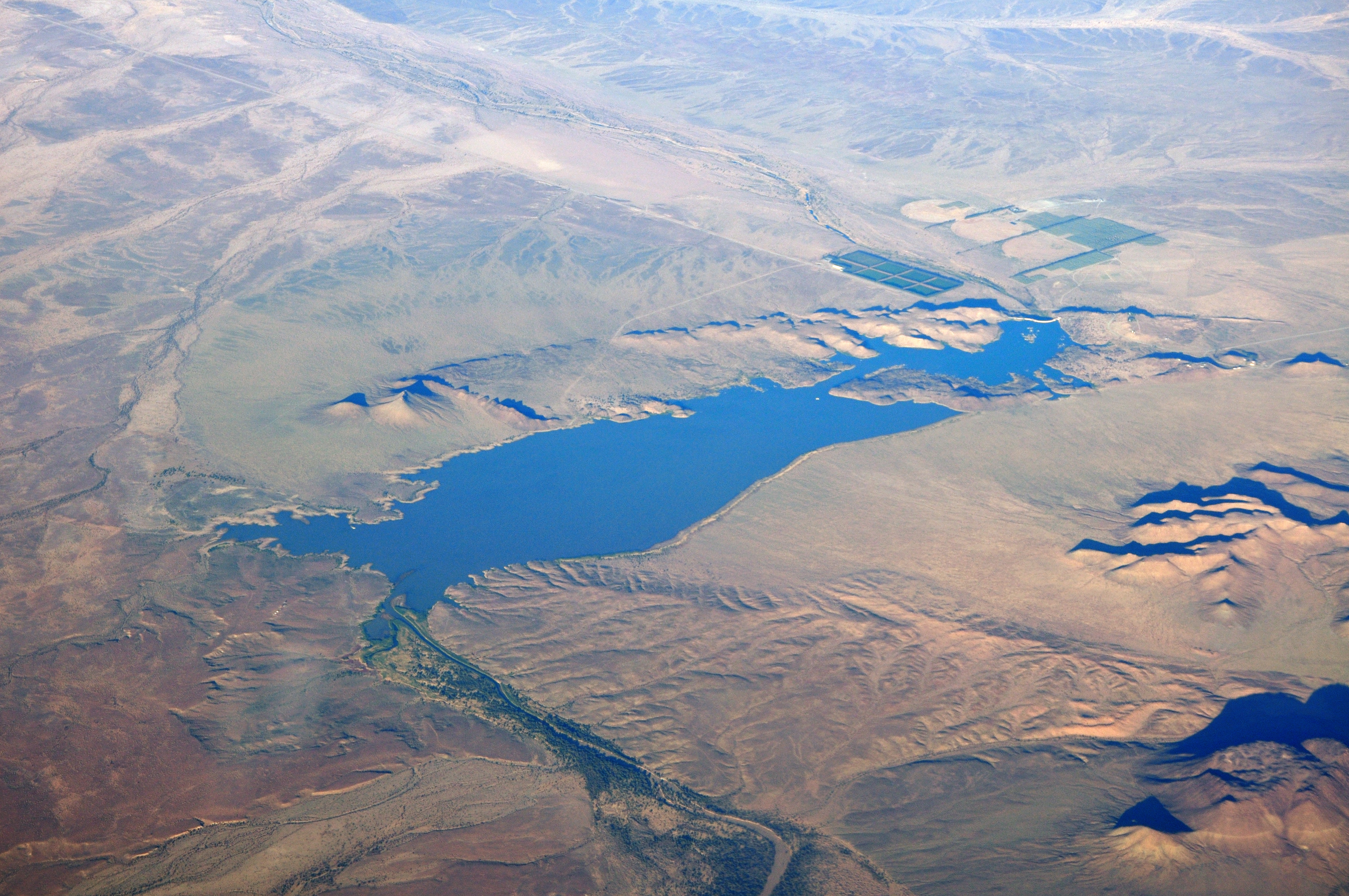

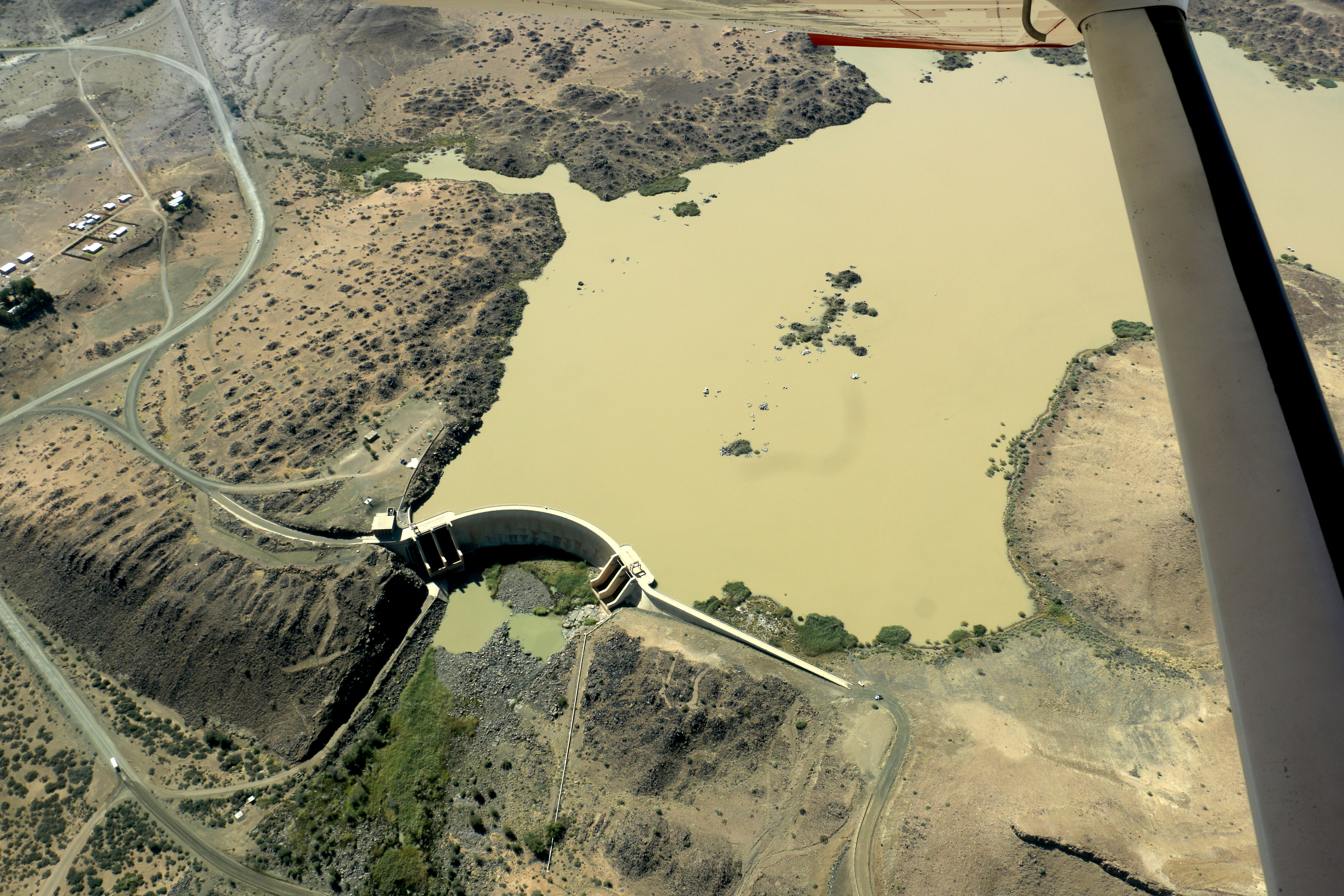
Bird's eye views of Naute Dam in 2010 and 2017 respectively

The Naute Dam is a dam outside of Keetmanshoop in the Karas Region of Namibia. It was built by Concor between 1970 and 1972 and was officially commissioned in September 1972. It is the third largest dam in Namibia after Hardap Dam to Naute's north and can hold up to 69 million cubic metres of water. The dam's source is the Löwen River, a tributary of the Fish River.

== Business ==
Naute Dam supplies potable water to Keetmanshoop and some surrounding farms, but is predominantly used for irrigation. It has been consistently underutilised and is one of just a few dams in Namibia that are often filled to capacity.

The Naute Aqua Fish Farms Project, a government-owned fish farm, is based at the dam.

Naute Fruit Farm is also located at the Naute Dam. The farm primarily grows dates for export to Europe. In 2009, the farm was projected to export 180 tonnes of dates, up from 120 the year before. As of March 2009, the farm employed 76 full-time employees and 250 seasonal workers.

== Pictures ==
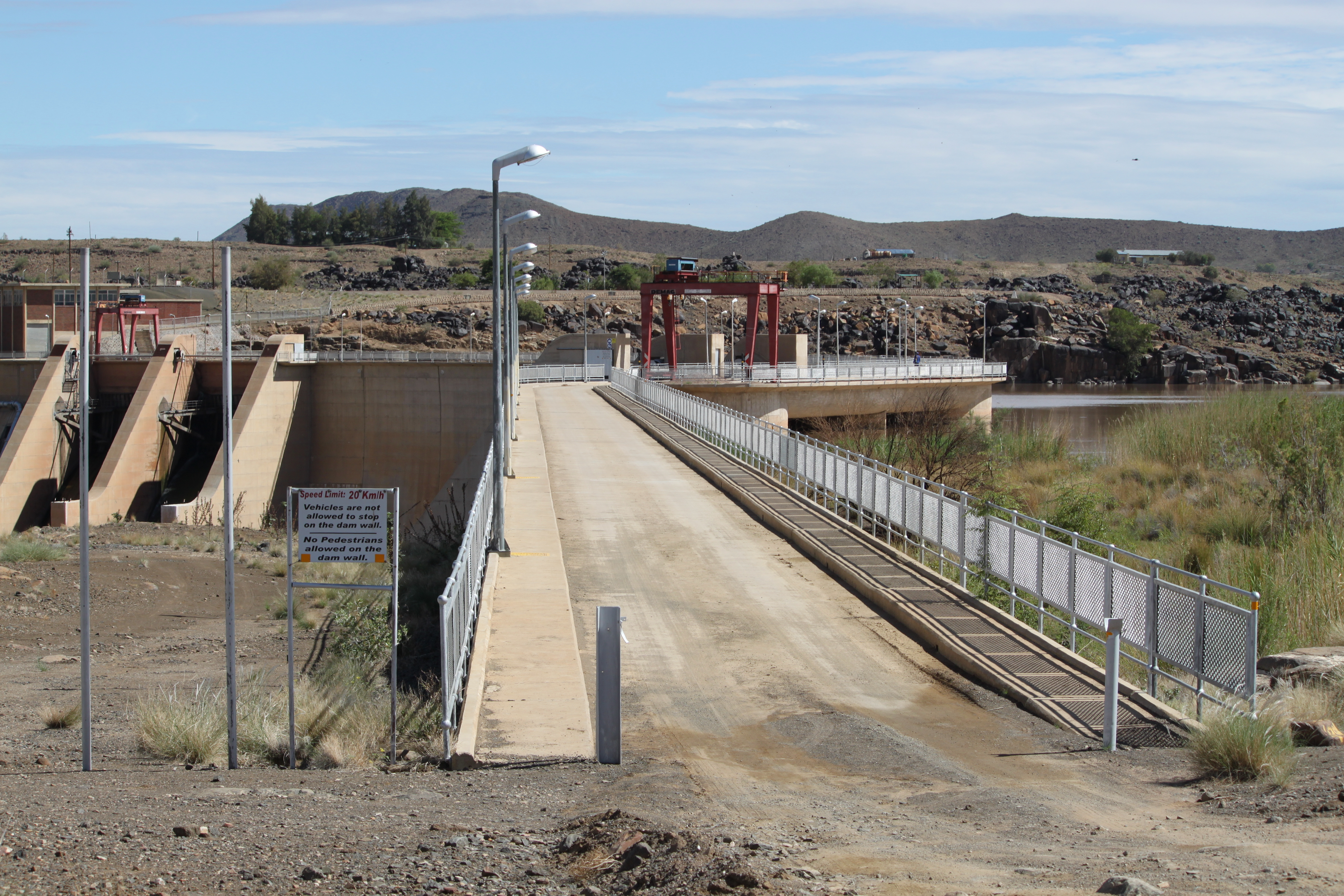
Naute Dam

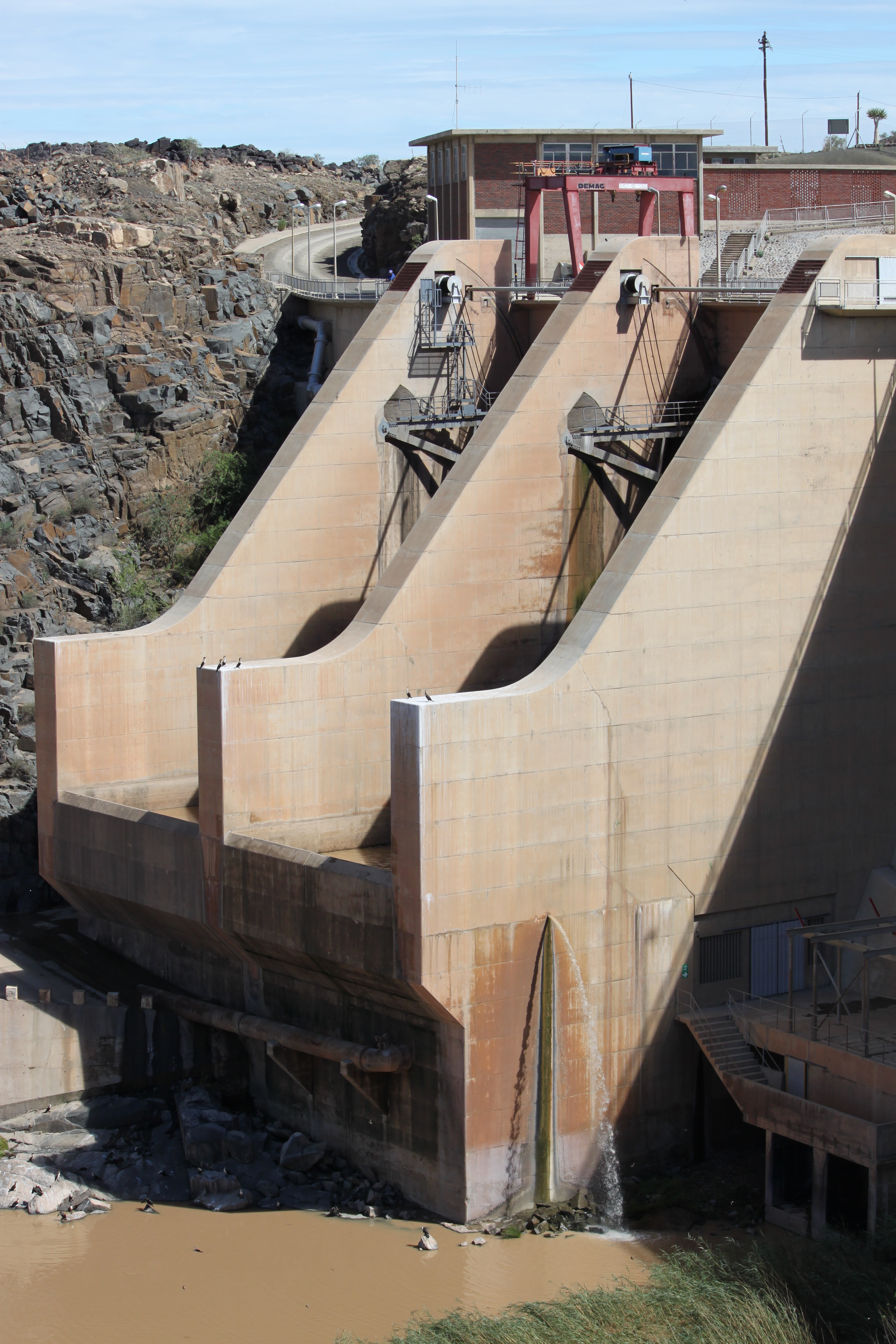
Naute Dam

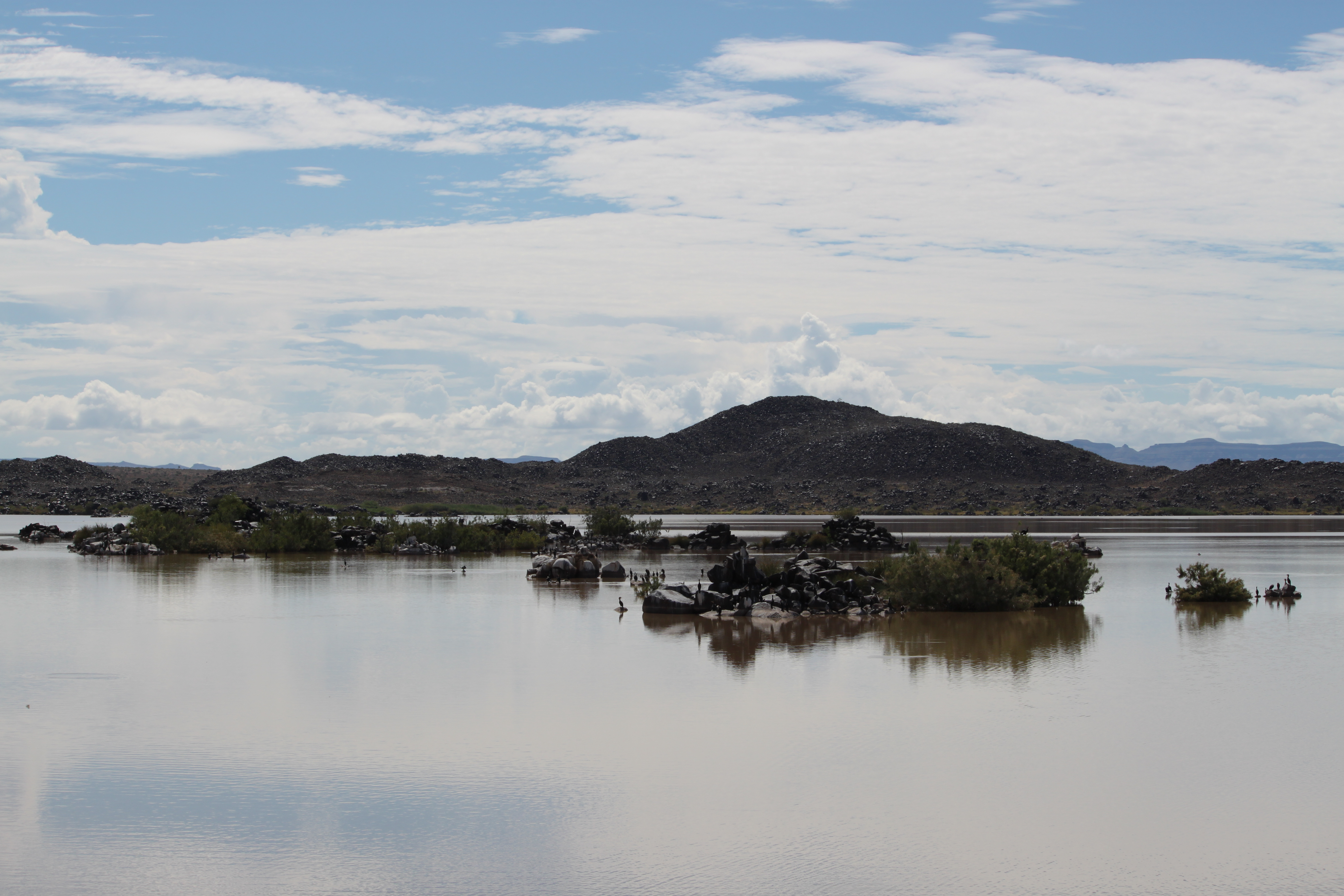
Reservoir of the Naute Dam

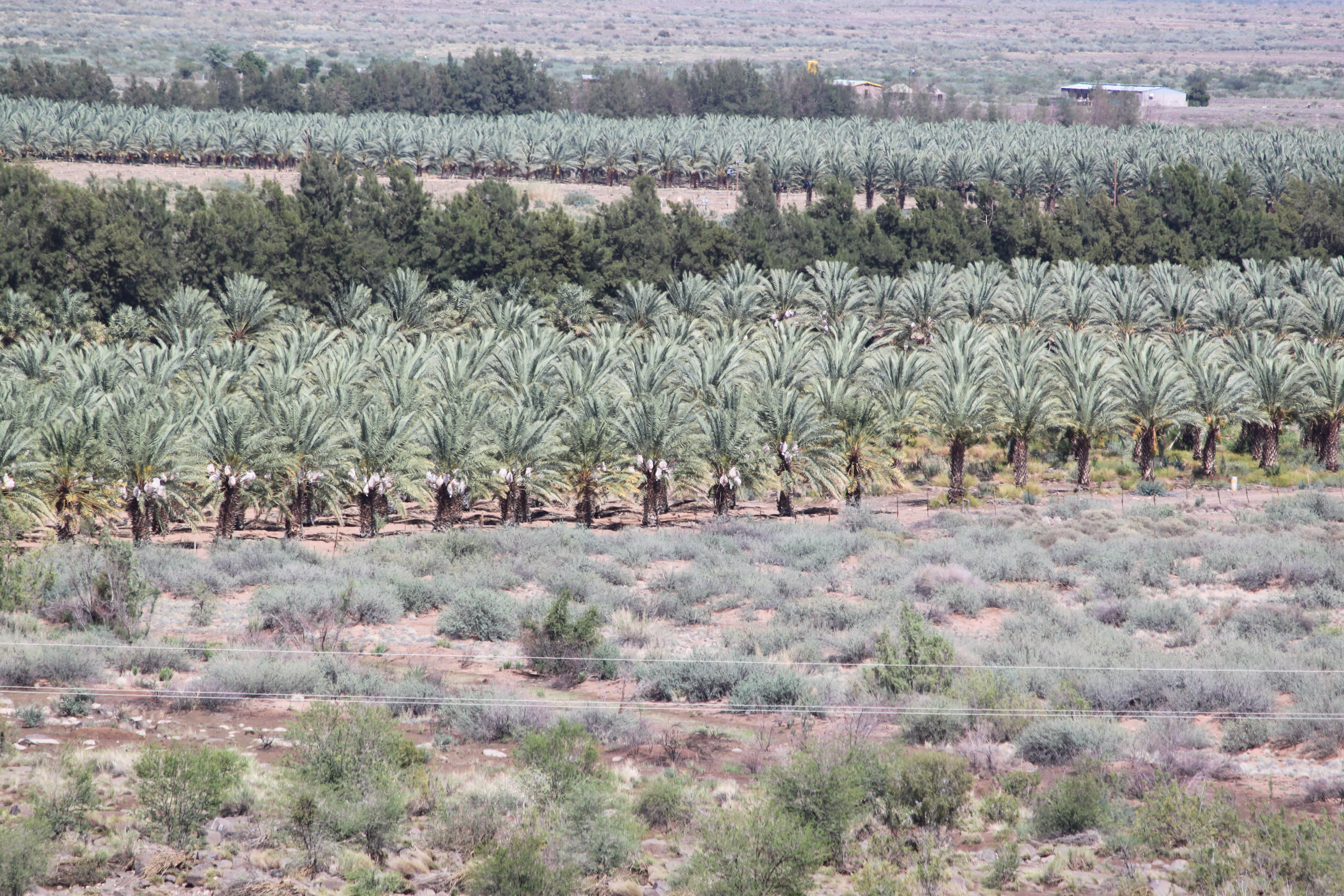
Plantage of date palms next to the Naute Dam
