= Hardap, Namibia =

Hardap may refer to:

- Hardap Region, one of the thirteen regions of Namibia
- Hardap Dam, the largest dam in Namibia
