= National Party of South West Africa =

National Party of South West Africa Nasionale Party van Suidwes-Afrika Nationale Partei Südwestafrikas
- Founded: 1924; 1939
- Dissolved: 1927; 1991
- Merged into: United National South West Party
- Succeeded by: Monitor Action Group
- Headquarters: South West Africa
- Ideology: Afrikaner nationalism Apartheid; Social conservatism South African rule in Namibia
- Political position: Far-right
- Slogan: South Africa First

The National Party of South West Africa (Afrikaans: Nasionale Party van Suidwes-Afrika, German: Nationale Partei Südwestafrikas) was a political party in South West Africa.

== History ==
The party was originally established in Mariental by Frikke Jooste in July 1924. It won two seats in the 1926 legislative elections, which saw the German League win eight of the twelve elected seats. On 31 January 1927 it merged with the South West Party, which had won one seat in the elections, to form the United National South West Party (UNSWP).

The National Party was re-established as a separate party in 1939, winning two seats in the 1940 elections, which saw the UNSWP win the remaining ten. It subsequently lost both seats in 1945, with the UNSWP winning all twelve. However, with its South African counterpart coming to power in 1948, the National Party also came to prominence in South West Africa, going on to win fifteen of the eighteen seats in the 1950 elections.

Thereafter the National Party dominated South West African politics, winning sixteen seats in the 1955 and 1961 elections and all eighteen in 1965. It subsequently won every seat in elections in 1970 and 1974.

A party congress in September 1977 saw a walkout of 80 moderate members led by Dirk Mudge, with Mudge forming the Republican Party on 5 October. Prior to the elections the following year, the National Party formed a multi-racial, Action Front for the Retention of Turnhalle Principles (ACTUR). However, it received only 12% of the vote, winning six seats to the Democratic Turnhalle Alliance's 41.

In 1980 a Second Tier Representative Authority was created for the white community. The National Party went on to dominate the body until its dissolution in 1989. It was part of the Action Christian National alliance alongside the German League for the 1989 elections, with the alliance winning three seats. In 1991 the party was disbanded, with party leader Kosie Pretorius forming the Monitor Action Group.

== Leaders ==
- 1968–81: A.H. du Plessis
- 1981–91: Kosie Pretorius

== Electoral history ==
=== Legislative Assembly elections ===
Election	Votes	%	Seats	+/–	Position	Status
1926	612	26.12%	2 / 18	▲2	2nd	Opposition
1940	3,046	37.48%	2 / 18	▲2	2nd	Opposition
1945	3,154	34.67%	0 / 18	▼2	2nd	Extra-parliamentary
1950	12,349	55.14%	15 / 18	▲15	▲1st	Supermajority government
1955	15,484	58.83%	16 / 18	▲1	1st	Supermajority government
1961	19,360	59.43%	16 / 18	Steady	1st	Supermajority government
1965	21,240	67.80%	18 / 18	▲2	1st	Supermajority government
1970			18 / 18	Steady	1st	Supermajority government
1974			18 / 18	Steady	1st	Supermajority government
