= Ombili =

Ombili, which means peace in Oshivambo, can refer to the following:

- a quarter in Katutura, Windhoek
- a suburb of Mariental, Namibia
- a foundation north of Tsumeb, aimed at improving living conditions for the San people in Namibia
