= 1929 South West African parliamentary election =

Parliamentary elections were held in South West Africa on 3 July 1929. The whites-only election saw a victory for the United National South West Party, which won seven of the twelve elected seats in the Legislative Assembly.

== Electoral system ==
The Legislative Assembly had 18 seats, of which twelve were elected in single-member constituencies, and six were appointed by the territory's Administrator, Albertus Johannes Werth. The twelve constituencies were Gibeon, Gobabis, Grootfontein, Keetmanshoop, Kolmanskop, Luderitz, Okahandja, Omaruru, Swakopmund, Warmbad, Windhoek Central and Windhoek District.

== Results ==
One seat, Grootfontein, was won unopposed by the German League in South West Africa. Of the six members appointed by Werth, three were from the German League and three from the United National South West Party, giving the latter a simple majority in the Legislative Assembly.

Party	Votes	%	Seats	+/–
United National South West Party	2,108	49.38	7	+4
German League in South West Africa	971	22.75	4	–4
Independents	1,190	27.88	1	0
Appointed members	0	0.00	6	0
Total	4,269	100.00	18	0
Source: Ngavirue
