= 1974 South West African parliamentary election =

Parliamentary elections were held in South West Africa on 24 April 1974. The last Whites-only election saw a victory for the National Party of South West Africa, which won all 18 seats in the Legislative Assembly for the third consecutive election.

== Results ==
Party	Seats	+/–
National Party of South West Africa	18	0
Total	18	0
Source: African Elections Database
