= 1945 South West African parliamentary election =

Parliamentary elections were held in South West Africa on 19 May 1945. The whites-only election saw a clean sweep for the United National South West Party, which won all 12 elected seats in the Legislative Assembly.

== Electoral system ==
The Legislative Assembly had 18 seats, of which twelve were elected in single-member constituencies, and six were appointed by the territory's Administrator, Petrus Imker Hoogenhout. The twelve constituencies for the elected seats were Gibeon, Gobabis, Grootfontein, Keetmanshoop, Luderitz, Okahandja, Otjiwarongo, Stampriet, Swakopmund, Warmbad, Windhoek Central and Windhoek District.

== Results ==
For the first time, all 12 constituencies were contested. Of the six members appointed by Administrator, four were from the United National South West Party and two from the National Party, giving the former a total of 16 seats in the 18-member legislative body.

Party	Votes	%	Seats	+/–
United National South West Party	5,485	60.29	12	+2
National Party of South West Africa	3,154	34.67	0	–2
Independents	459	5.05	0	0
Appointed members			6	0
Total	9,098	100.00	18	0
Registered voters/turnout	12,358	–		
Source: Ngavirue
