= 1934 South West African parliamentary election =

Parliamentary elections were held in South West Africa on 31 October 1934. The whites-only election saw a victory for the United National South West Party, which won eight of the twelve elected seats in the Legislative Assembly.

== Electoral system ==
The Legislative Assembly had 18 seats, of which twelve were elected in single-member constituencies, and six were appointed by the territory's Administrator, David Gideon Conradie. The twelve constituencies were Gibeon, Gobabis, Grootfontein, Keetmanshoop, Kolmanskop, Luderitz, Okahandja, Otjiwarongo, Swakopmund, Warmbad, Windhoek Central and Windhoek District.

== Results ==
Three seats, Gibeon, Kootmanshoop and Kolmanskop, were won unopposed by the United National South West Party. Of the six members appointed by Administrator, two were from the German League and four from the United National South West Party, resulting in a clear majority for the latter for the second consecutive election.

Party	Votes	%	Seats	+/–
United National South West Party	2,168	52.20	8	+1
German League in South West Africa	558	13.44	1	–3
Economic League	808	19.46	1	New
Independents	619	14.90	2	+1
Appointed members			6	0
Total	4,153	100.00	18	0
Source: Ngavirue

The results exclude the figures for Swakopmund, where an independent candidate was elected with a 32-vote majority over their Economic League opponent.
