= 1970 South West African parliamentary election =

Parliamentary elections were held in South West Africa on 20 April 1970. A whites-only election saw a victory for the National Party of South West Africa, which won all 18 seats in the Legislative Assembly, as was to remain the case for all future elections during the apartheid era, where no other party won any seat.

== Results ==
Party	Seats	+/–
National Party of South West Africa	18	0
Total	18	0
Source: African Elections Database
