= 1940 South West African parliamentary election =

Parliamentary elections were held in South West Africa on 21 February 1940. The whites-only election saw a victory for the United National South West Party, which won 10 of the 12 elected seats in the Legislative Assembly.

== Electoral system ==
The Legislative Assembly had 18 seats, of which twelve were elected in single-member constituencies, and six were appointed by the territory's Administrator, David Gideon Conradie. The twelve constituencies for the elected seats were Gibeon, Gobabis, Grootfontein, Keetmanshoop, Luderitz, Okahandja, Otjiwarongo, Stampriet, Swakopmund, Warmbad, Windhoek Central and Windhoek District.

== Results ==
Two seats, Gibeon and Windhoek District, were won unopposed by the United National South West Party. Of the six members appointed by Administrator, all were from the United National South West Party, giving it 16 seats overall in the 18-member Legislative Assembly.

Party	Votes	%	Seats	+/–
United National South West Party	4,631	56.98	10	+2
National Party of South West Africa	3,046	37.48	2	New
Independents	451	5.55	0	−2
Appointed members			6	0
Total	8,128	100.00	18	0
Source: Ngavirue
