= Independent Economic Party =

The Independent Economic Party, initially known as the Mandate Party, was a political party in South West Africa, today Namibia. It was established in March 1955 by a pro-apartheid conservative White group consisting of Germans and Afrikaners in response to the statement of then-South African prime minister Daniel François Malan that the mandate of South Africa over South West Africa had lapsed. The party stood for the renewal of the mandate. It contested the November 1955 legislative election unsuccessfully under the name Independent Economic Party.
