= South West Party =

The South West Party (in Afrikaans: Suidwes Party, in German: Südwestpartei) was a political party in South West Africa, today Namibia. Initially the party was known as Union Party (Unie Party in Afrikaans). The party was founded in Windhoek in September 1924 by F. van der Heever, A.P. Olivier, and Andries de Wet. It took the name SWP in 1926.

In 1926, the SWP created a pact with the National Party of South West Africa, against the German League in South West Africa (German: Deutscher Bund in Südwestafrika, DBSW). The party contested four seats in the 1926 legislative elections, winning in Gibeon. The following year SWP and the National Party of South West Africa (NPSWA) merged to form the United National South West Party (UNSWP). The UNSWP formed the government of South West Africa from 1926 to 1950.
