= 1926 South West African parliamentary election =

Parliamentary elections were held for the first time in the territory of South West Africa on 26 May 1926. The German League in South West Africa won eight of the twelve elected seats in the Whites-only election.

== Electoral system ==
The Legislative Assembly had 18 seats, of which twelve were elected in single-member constituencies, and six were appointed by the territory's Administrator, Albertus Johannes Werth. The twelve constituencies where elections were to take place were Gibeon, Gobabis, Grootfontein, Keetmanshoop, Kolmanskop, Luderitz, Okahandja, Omaruru, Swakopmund, Warmbad, Windhoek Central and Windhoek District.

== Results ==
German League candidates were returned unopposed in six of the twelve constituencies; Grootfontein, Keetmanshoop, Kolmanskop, Luderitz, Swakopmund and Windhoek. Of the six members appointed by Werth, two were from the German League and four from the National Party.

Party	Votes	%	Seats
National Party of South West Africa	612	26.12	2
South West Party	555	23.69	1
German League in South West Africa	498	21.25	8
Independents	678	28.94	1
Appointed members	0	0.00	6
Total	2,343	100.00	18
Source: Ngavirue
