= Economic League (South West Africa) =

The Economic League (German: Wirtschaftliche Partei) was a German political party in South West Africa.

== History ==
The party was established shortly before the 1934 elections by German members of the Legislative Assembly who had walked out of the Assembly when the South West African branch of the Nazi Party and Hitler Youth had been banned and their leaders deported.

The whites-only elections saw the Economic League nominate four candidates for the 12 elected seats. Although it received almost 20% of the vote overall, it won only one seat, Okahandja. The party did not contest any further national elections.
