= Hardap Dam =

2nd largest dam in Namibia

Coordinates: 24°29′58″S 17°51′31″E

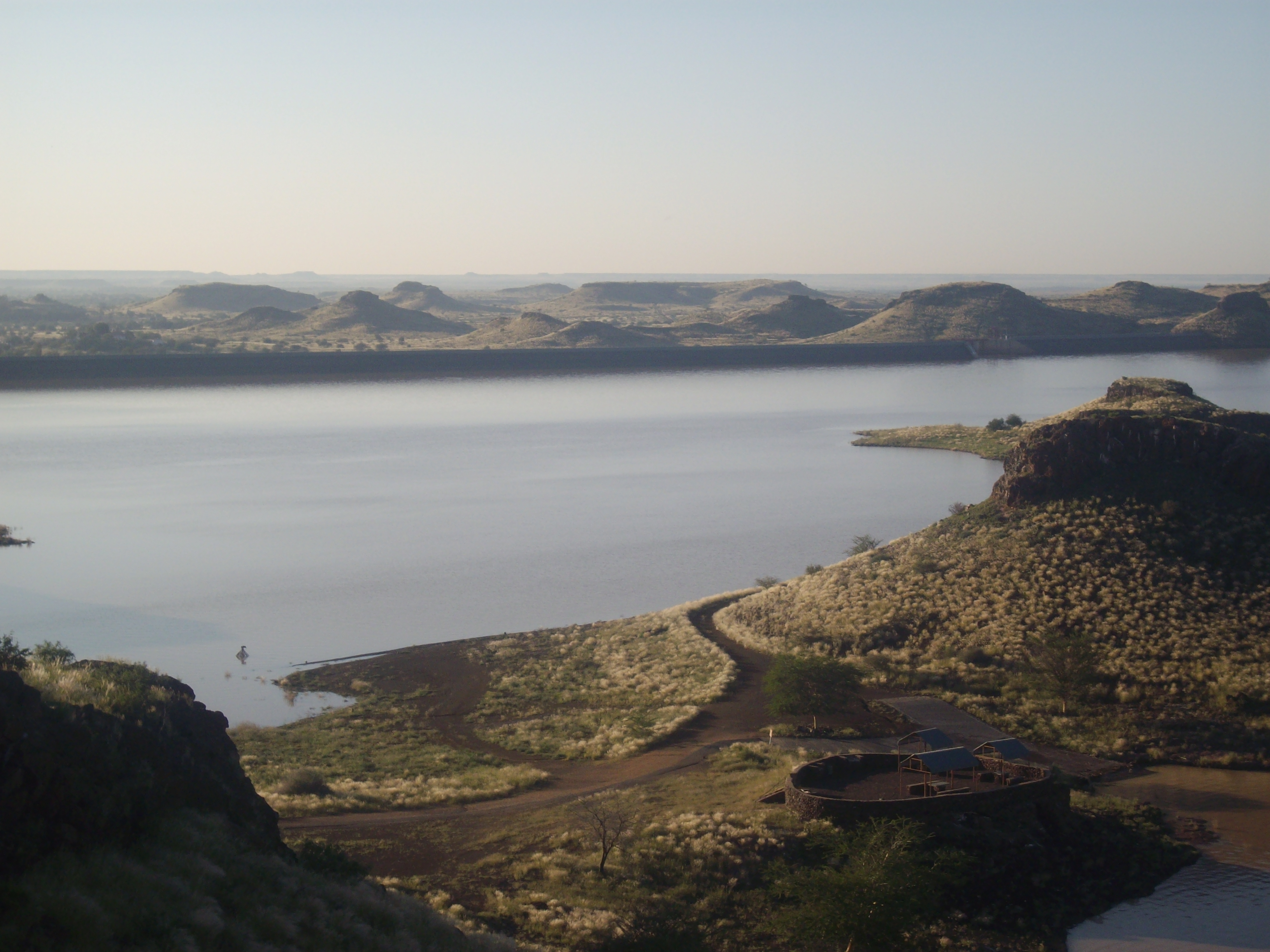
- View of Hardap Dam at sunrise in April 2008

- Location within Namibia
- Official name: Hardap Dam
- Country: Namibia
- Location: 260 km (160 mi) south of Windhoek
- Construction began: 1960
- Opening date: 1963

Dam and spillways
- Impounds: Fish River

Reservoir
- Total capacity: 320 million cubic metres (420,000,000 cu yd)
- Surface area: 25 km^{2} (2,500 ha)

The Hardap Dam is a dam close to Mariental in the Hardap Region of central Namibia. Built in 1963 while Namibia was under South African occupation, the Hardap Dam had remained the largest dam in the country for more than five decades. After its completion in 2018, the Neckertal Dam near Keetmanshoop has at least 3 times the capacity of the Hardap Dam. The Hardap reservoir dams the Fish River and is home to numerous examples of wildlife of Namibia.

== Description ==
First envisaged in 1897, Hardap Dam has a capacity of 320 million cubic metres (420,000,000 cu yd) and a surface area of 25 km^{2} (2,500 ha). Construction began in 1960 and was completed in 1963.

The Hardap Dam supplies Mariental and the surrounding settlements with potable water. Its location close to the city, however, also poses a danger of flooding when sluices have to be opened fully due to good rains in the Fish River's catchment area. Reed grasses growing in the riverbed of the Fish River, slow down the flow of water and further aggravate the danger of flooding.

Before the dam was built, Mariental was flooded in 1923 and 1934. Floods after the commissioning of the dam occurred in 1972, 1974, 1976, 2000, and 2006. Since then, the dam's water level is kept at a maximum of 70% of its capacity to prevent both an overflow and an uncontrolled outflow through fully opened sluices.

== Etymology ==
The name Hardap derives from the Nama word meaning "nipple" or "wart", which is how the surrounding area of low conical-shaped hills appeared to the early inhabitants. There are fishing spots at various points along the northern shore of the lake. Permits, and a map of permitted fishing areas, are available from the resort office, or from the magistrate's office in Mariental.

== Flora and fauna ==
The area is home to the black rhino, gemsbok, Hartmann's zebra, kudu, ostrich, springbok and steenbok. There is also a large variety of bird species to be observed in and around the dam. Great White Pelican, cormorant, darter and spoonbill can be seen on the dam itself, as well as fish eagle and a small number of osprey.

The vegetation in the area is classified as dwarf shrub savanna. The following trees occur: camel thorn, wild green-hair tree and buffalo thorn.

== Tourism ==
After a four-year period of renovation the dam's recreational sites have been reopened in 2016. Activities at the dam include swimming, fishing, and bird watching. There is a restaurant and a shop.

== Gallery ==
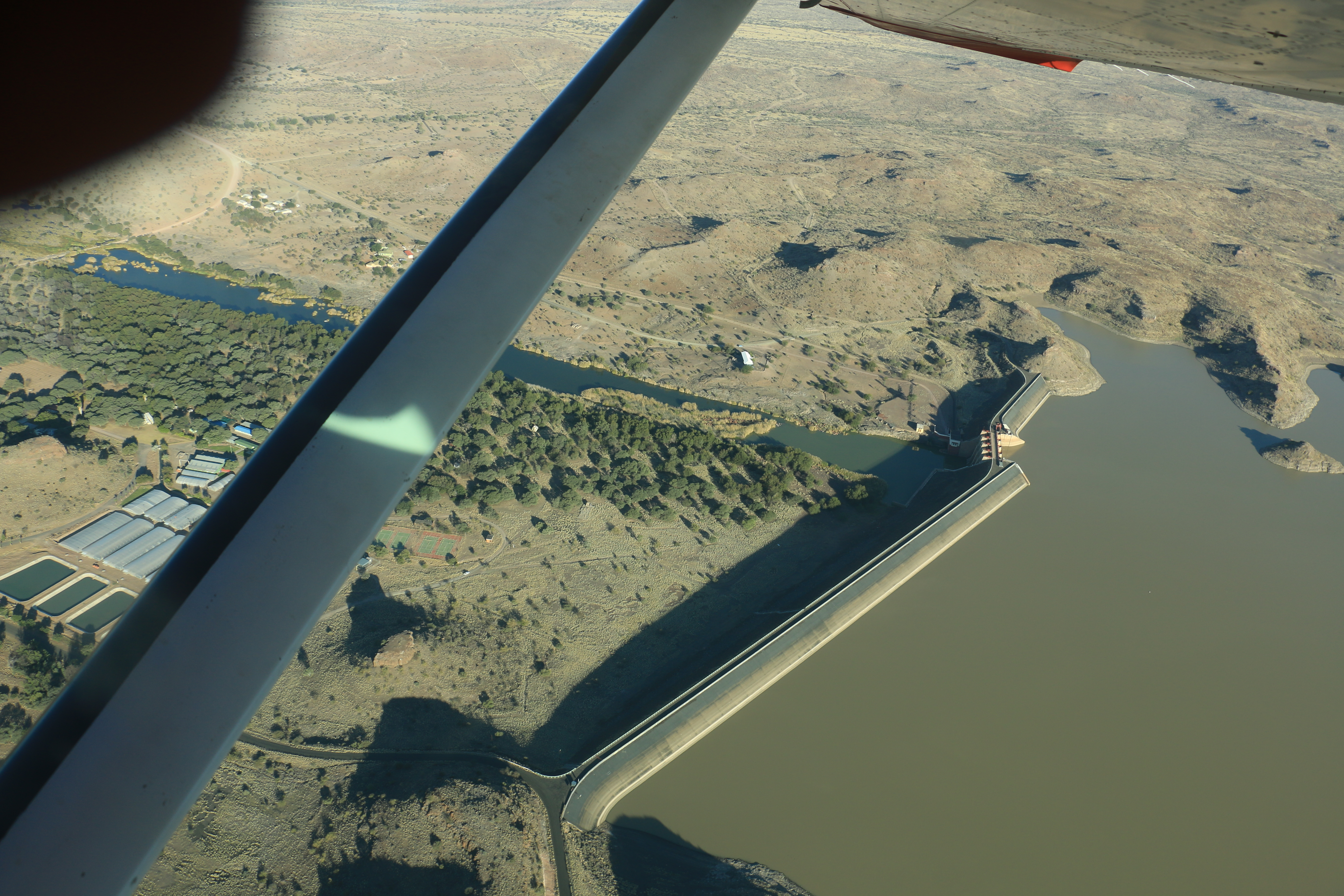
The dam wall from above, 2016

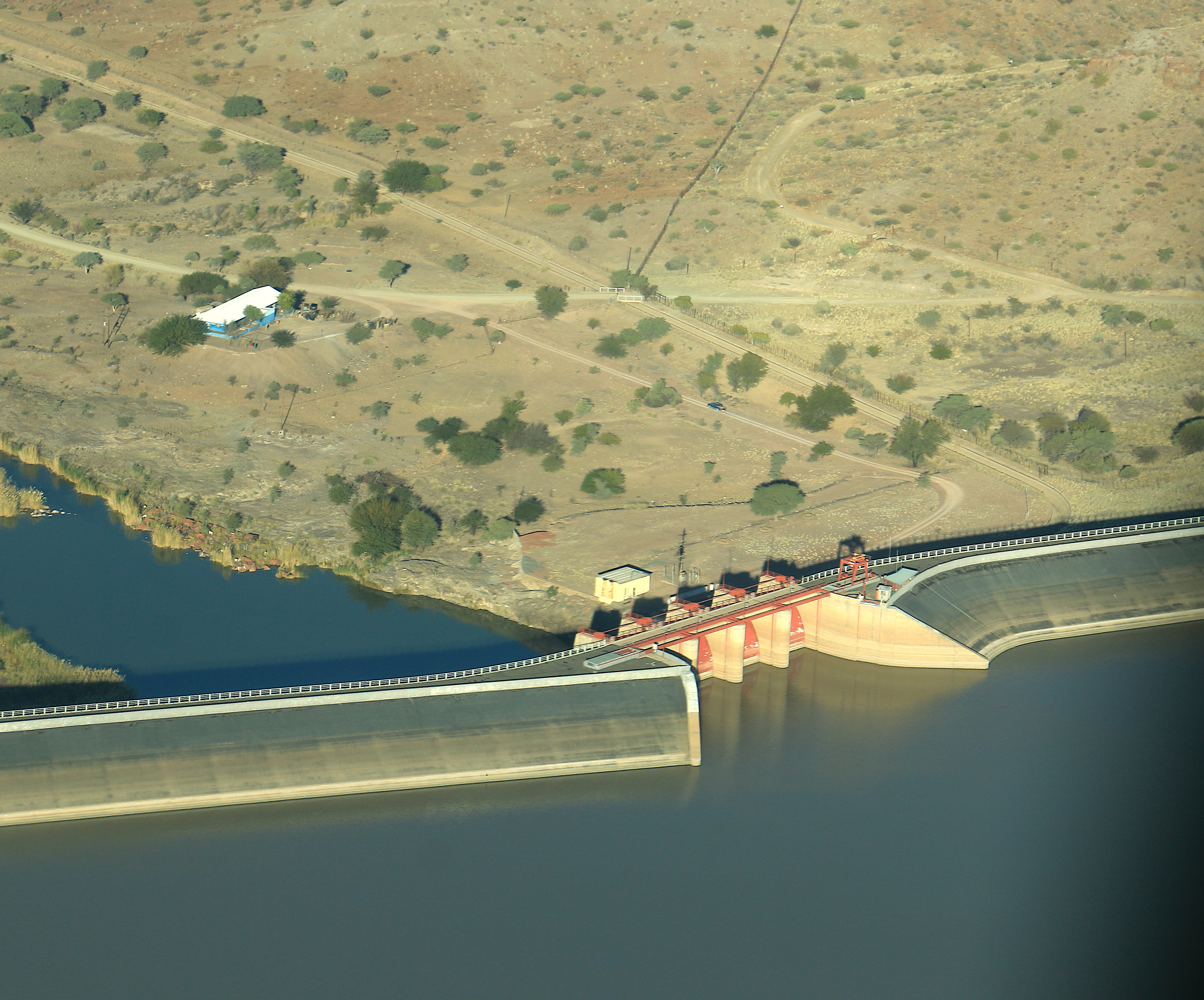
View of the dam gates from above

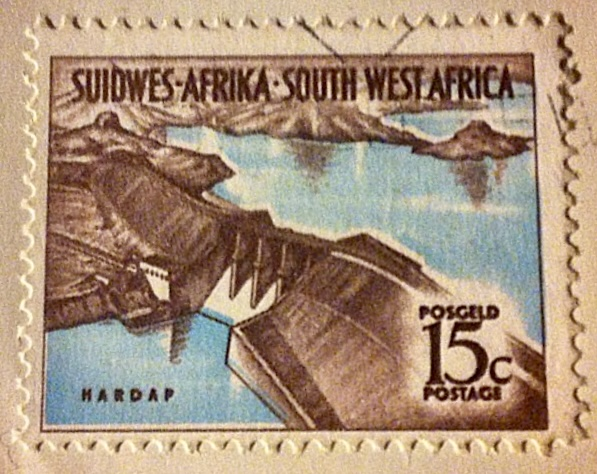
Postage stamp commemorating the construction of the dam, 1961

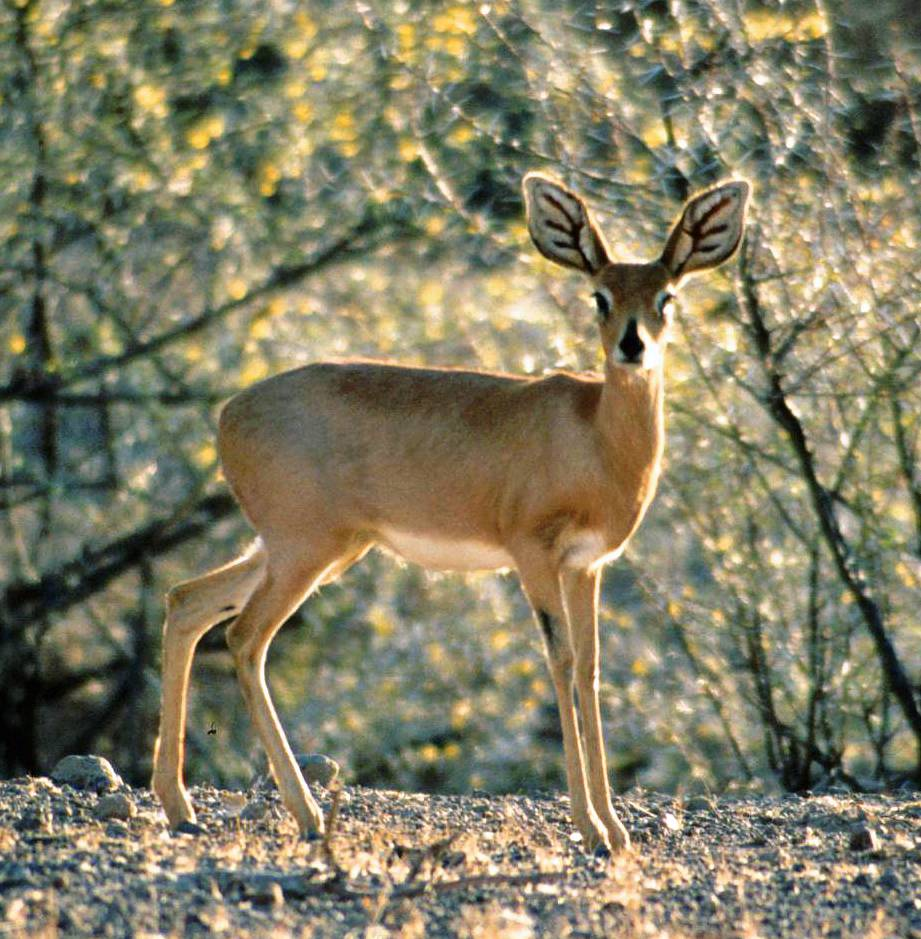
Animals at Hardap Dam: a Steenbok

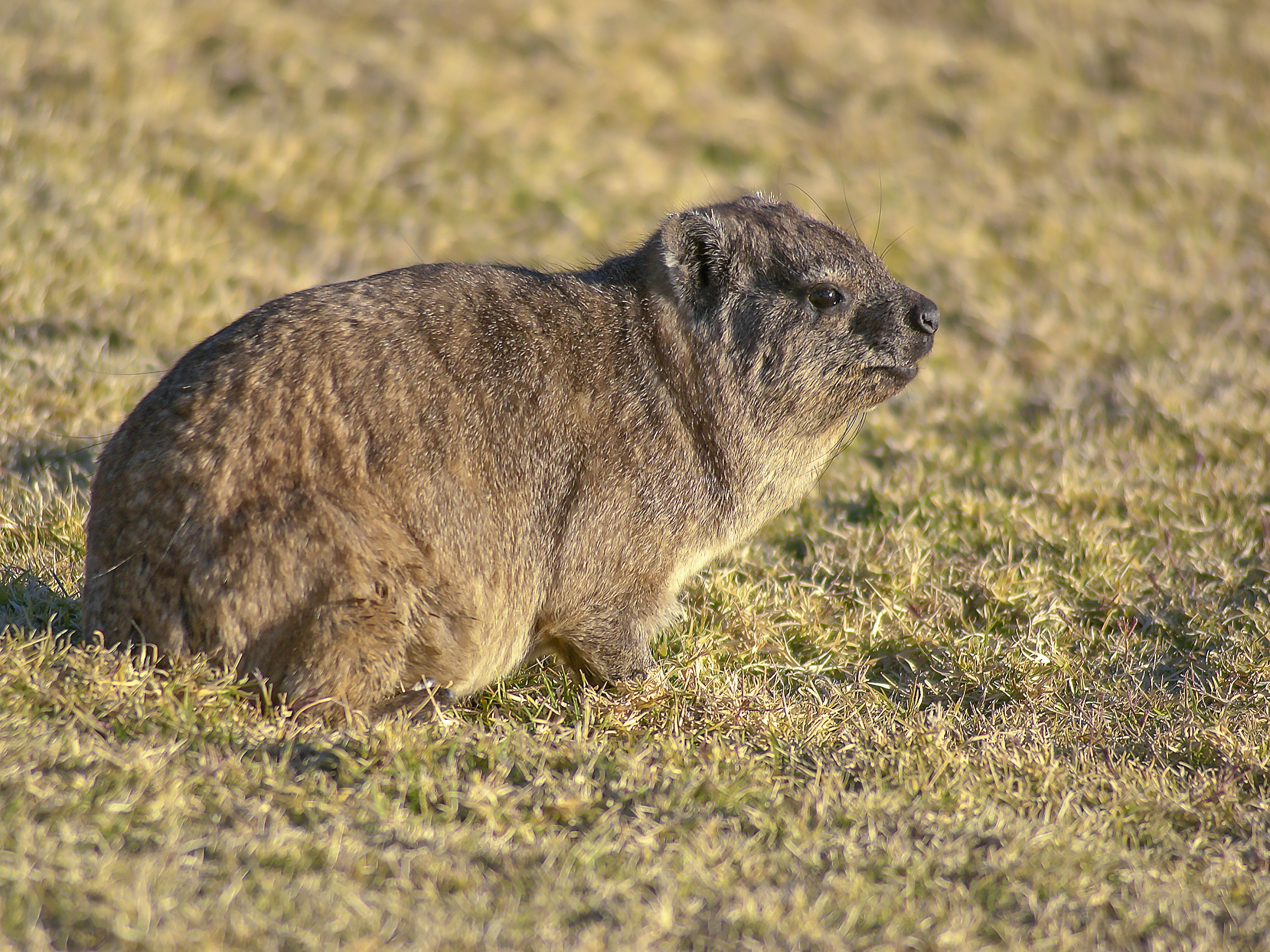
A cape hyrax

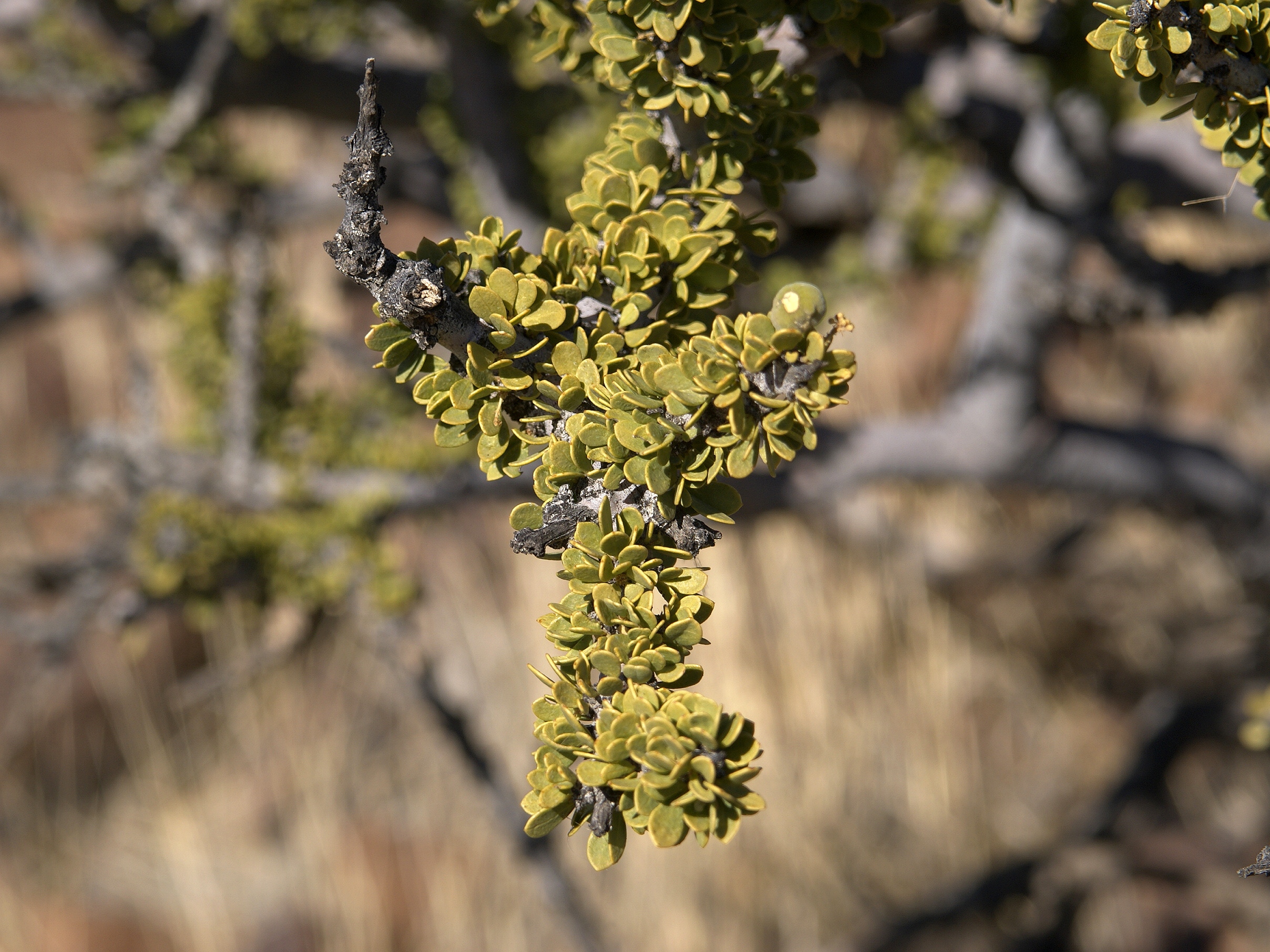
Close-up of a Smelly Shepherd tree (Boscia foetida)

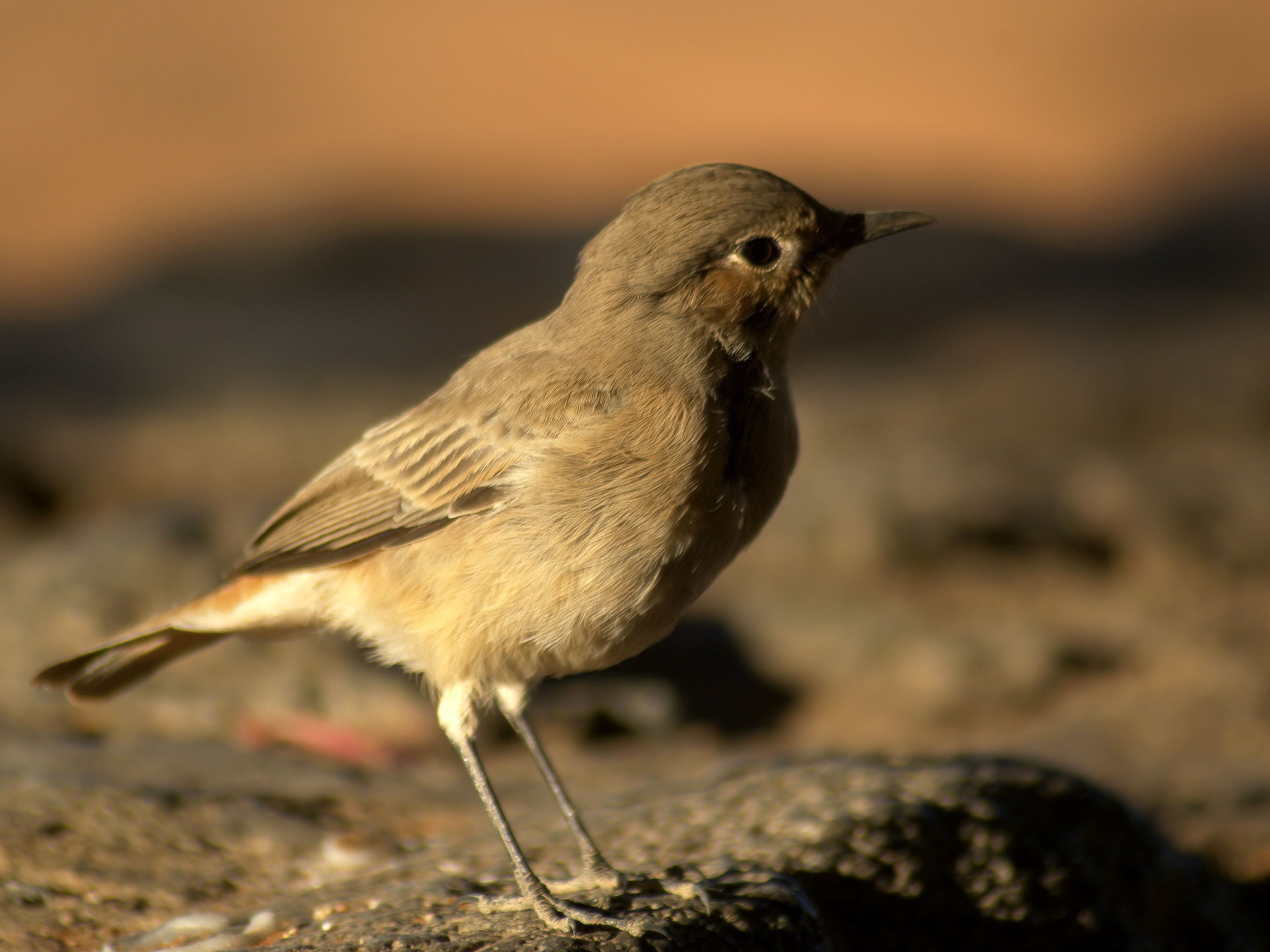
Familiar Chat
