= United National South West Party =

The United National South West Party (Afrikaans: Verenigde Nasionale Suidwes Party, German: Vereinigte Nationale Südwestpartei) was a political party in South West Africa, the local counterpart of the South African United Party but founded eight years earlier and merged into the latter in 1971. It was formed through a merger of National Party of South West Africa and the South West Party, in order to counter the influence of the German League in South West Africa. The first congress of UNSWP was held in Windhoek on 1–2 April 1927.

The UNSWP favoured incorporation of South West Africa into South Africa, and won elections to the Legislative Assembly elections in 1929, 1934, 1940 and 1945.

With the coming of the National Party of South West Africa in the late 1930s, some Afrikaners switched loyalties to the new party. Meanwhile, after 1939 the policy of the UNSWP tended to follow Gen. Smuts instead of Gen. Hertzog, in part because of the fear of a new German interest in the territory. It continued to control the Legislative Assembly until 1950, at which point it held fifteen of the eighteen seats. But the National Party had won control in South Africa in 1948, and in 1950 elections in Namibia the National Party won sixteen seats while the UNSWP retained only two (which it lost in 1966). However, they continued running for the six local seats in the House of Assembly of South Africa in five South African general elections, in 1953, 1958, 1961, 1966, and 1970. Despite good organization and the support of over 40% of South-West Africans in the first three of those elections, the party never succeeded in sending a single representative to the House of Assembly.

The main publication of UNSWP was the newspaper Die Suidwes Afrikaner.

== Origin ==
The United Party started under very different circumstances in South-West Africa from those from which it sprang in Union of South Africa. Under the terms of the South-West Africa Constitution Act of 1925, the South African Parliament granted a Legislative Assembly to the mandate area, conditioning the informal politics of the region's white settlers along more conventional partisan lines. The Germans organized into the German League in South West Africa(German: Deutscher Bund in Südwestafrika, DBSW), while Afrikaners were divided between the local National Party (South Africa) (NPSWA) and the South West Party (SWP, a local counterpart of the South African Party in the Union). The SWP formed a coalition with the NPSWA in the 1926 legislative election but lost to the DBSW. The SWP and NSWA thus were compelled to merge into the UNSWP on January 31, 1927. Campaigning on economic progress and annexation to South Africa, the coalition won the 1929 election.

== Rise of the NP ==
World War II robbed the DBSW of its influence and thus undermined the UNSWP's raison d'être. The local National Party was re-founded there, but struggled until its Union election triumph in 1948. Prime Minister Daniel Malan passed legislation making the growing region the Union of South Africa's fifth province, and that year the NP won six local seats in the House of Assembly, both local Senate seats, and 15 out of 18 constituencies in the Legislative Assembly. The UNSWP eventually lost the other three Legislative Assembly seats, but the party remained vibrant locally under the leadership of J.P. de M. Niehaus, who was nominated as Senator for Natal by the national United Party as a reward for his work.

On November 16, 1971, the UNSWP was merged into the United Party of South Africa (UP) as a provincial party. Senator Niehaus was elected chairman of the South West Africa United Party. He lost his Natal seat when the Senate was reorganized after the April 1974 South African general election.

== 1950 election ==
Malan wanted to build upon his parliamentary majority after the NP's narrow victory in the 1948 South African general election, and therefore was keen on following in the footsteps of his predecessor Jan Smuts, who had already advocated for South West African representation in Parliament. Thus, in 1949 South West Africa was assigned six seats in the House of Assembly and four in the Senate (two Senators elected, two appointed). The South West African seats averaged half the population compared to those in the Union proper. With this legislation, Malan made South West Africa in effect the fifth province in the Union, defying the 1946 United Nations agreement with Smuts that forbade such annexation.

The six Assembly seats were Windhoek (constituency), Namib (constituency), Karas (constituency), Etosha (constituency), Midelland (constituency), and Omaruru (constituency). The Legislative Assembly, which had included some appointed members, was transformed into one where all 18 representatives were elected. The UP, though in principle supportive of representation for South West Africa, opposed the high number of seats relative to the local white population but did not wish to alienate local voters by opposing it strongly, and hoped its leaders' role in occupying the former German colony in 1915 would work in its favor.

The 1950 South West African legislative election was thus held. The incumbent UP local government had always resisted efforts to place South West Africa under UN trusteeship, but nevertheless agreed to submit annual reports to the UN. After the NP harshly criticized the first report, the UP decided to stop filing them. In 1949, the UN approached the World Court for an advisory opinion on the Union's treatment of the area. The majority verdict of the court in July 1950 stated that while the Union was not obliged to submit the area to full UN administration, it was still to be overseen along the lines of the old League of Nations mandate.

The international controversy over South West Africa gave the NP ample motivation to oppose the UNSWP, but the latter nonetheless had so far prevailed with the support of the South African opposition. The NP slogan held that they would not throw the territory "to the wolves." In contrast to South Africa in 1948 and 1953, most voters supported the NP (12,434 or 55.4%) over the UNSWP (10,003 or 44.6%), padding the federal upper house majority for the NP nationally and winning a comfortable 13 seats in the Union People's Council. In all six seats, except for Etosha where the NP won by 846, the UNSWPNP only narrowly won winning by 67 votes in Karas, 229 in Middelland, 441 in Namib, 584 in Omaruru, and 234 in Windhoek.

== Later elections ==
From 1953 onward, South West African and South African elections coincided. In 1953, the NP won locally 13,305 votes (56.6%) to the UNSWP's 10,021 (42.6%), winning Assembly seats by 1,205 votes in Etosha, 238 votes in Karas, 272 in Middelland, 554 in Namib, 826 in Omaruru, and 189 in Windhoek. In 1958, the NP won locally 16,390 votes (58.2%) to the UNSWP's 11,568 (41.1%), by a margin of 1,334 votes in Etosha, 449 votes in Karas, 604 in Middelland, 689 in Namib, 1,204 in Omaruru, and 506 in Windhoek. The UNSWP gradually declined and in 1970, the last election in which it participated, only contested four of the six Assembly seats and 28.8% of the vote.

== See also ==
Andries de Wet

== Bibliography ==
- Böeseken, Dr. A.J., Krüger, Dr. D.W., and Kieser, Dr. A. 1953. Drie eeue. Die verhaal van ons vaderland. (English: "Three Centuries: The Story of Our Fatherland"). Cape Town: Nasionale Boekhandel. (English: "National Bookstore")
- Krüger, Prof. D.W. 1978. The making of a nation. A history of the Union of South Africa, 1910-1961. Johannesburg & London: Macmillan.
- Potgieter, D.J. (ed.) 1972. Standard Encyclopaedia of Southern Africa. Cape Town: Nasionale Opvoedkundige Uitgewery (Nasou).
- Schoeman, B.M. 1977. Parlementêre verkiesings in Suid-Afrika 1910-1976. (English: "Parliamentary elections in South Africa 1910-1976"). Pretoria: Aktuele Publikasies.
- Van der Spuy, D.C. (chief ed.). 1975. Amptelike Jaarboek van die Republiek van Suid-Afrika 1975 (Eerste Uitgawe). (English: "Official Yearbook of the Republic of South Africa 1975 [First Edition]"). Pretoria: Departement van Inligting. (English: "Department of Information")
