= Mariental, Namibia =

Mariental Tsaraxeibes
- City
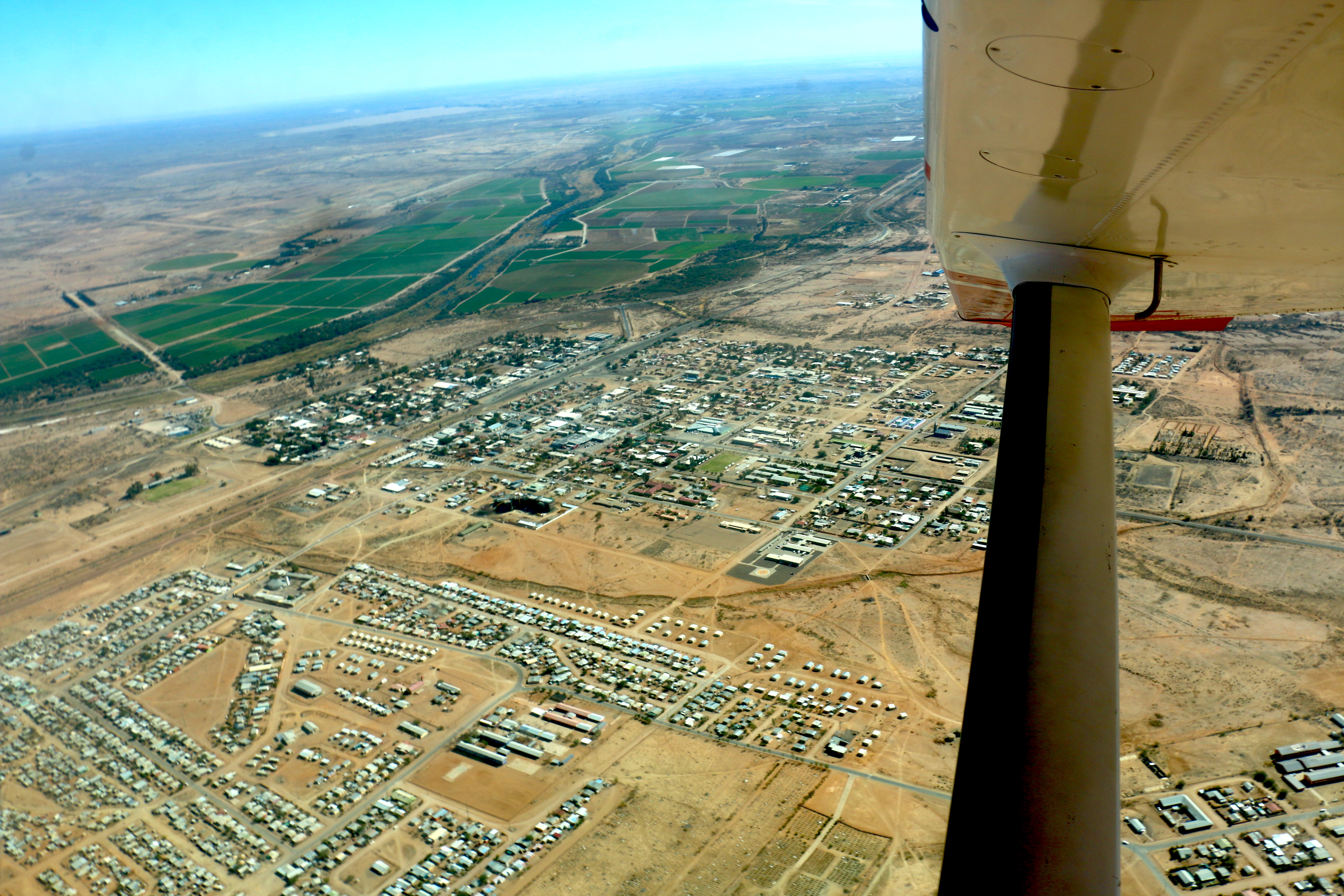
- Mariental from bird's eye view in 2017

- Seal
- Nickname: Stofbakkies
- Motto: Luceat et crescat
- Location in Namibia
- Coordinates: 24°38′S 17°58′E
- Country: Namibia
- Region: Hardap Region

Government
  - Mayor: Cherien Kock

Area
  - Total: 34.4 km^{2} (13.3 sq mi)
- Elevation: 1,090 m (3,580 ft)

Population (2023)
  - Total: 18,494
  - Density: 538/km^{2} (1,390/sq mi)
- Time zone: UTC+2 (South African Standard Time)

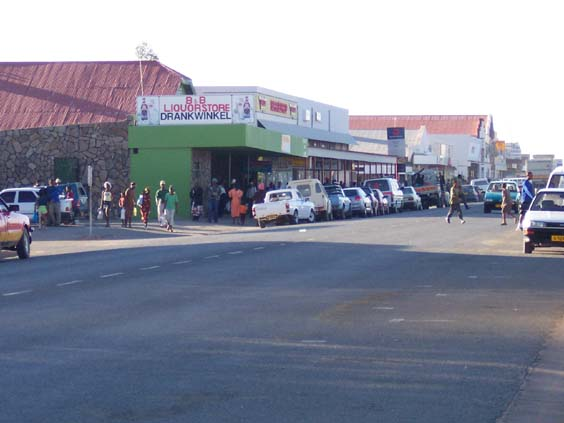
Mariental Main Street

Mariental is a city in south-central Namibia. It had 18,494 inhabitants in 2023. It is the administrative capital of the Hardap Region in an area which has long been a centre for the Nama people. It lies near the Hardap Dam, the second largest reservoir in Namibia.

== History ==
Named by local Rhenish (German Lutheran) missionaries, the town was founded in 1912 as a railway stop between Windhoek and Keetmanshoop and named after Maria, the wife of the first colonial settler of the area, Hermann Brandt. It is home to the oldest Dutch Reformed church congregation in Namibia, founded in 1898. It was proclaimed a town in 1920 and a municipality in 1946. Mariental is home to a large number of Nama-speaking people, descendants of the early Khoi inhabitants of Namibia.

== Geography ==
Mariental is situated on the B1 national road, 232 km (144 mi) north of Keetmanshoop and 274 km (170 mi) southeast of Windhoek. It lies at an elevation of 1,090 m (3,580 ft). Mariental is connected to the TransNamib railway line from Windhoek to Keetmanshoop.

=== Hardap dam ===
The Hardap Dam, situated 22 kilometres (14 mi) northwest of Mariental, is the second largest dam in Namibia. It supplies the city with water and controls the flow of the Fish River , which flows in a southerly direction past the town. Hardap Dam has a capacity of 320 million cubic metres (420,000,000 cu yd) and a surface area of 25 km^{2} (2,500 ha; 6,200 acres). Construction began in 1960 and was completed in 1963.

Before the dam was built, Mariental was flooded in 1923 and 1934. However, whenever dam sluices have to be opened fully due to good rains in the Fish River's catchment area, Mariental is still prone to floods, with reed grasses growing in the riverbed of the Fish River slowing down the flow of water and aggravating the danger.

Floods occurred after the commissioning of the dam in 1972, 1974, 1976, 2000, and 2006. Since then, the dam's water level has been kept at a maximum of 70% of its capacity to prevent both an overflow and an uncontrolled outflow through fully opened sluices.

=== Demographics ===
Historical population
Year	Pop.	±% p.a.
2001	9,836	—
2011	12,478	+2.41%
2023	18,494	+3.33%

=== Climate ===
Mariental has a hot desert climate (Köppen climate classification BWh), with extremely hot summers and very warm winters (with warm days and cold nights). The average annual precipitation is 194 mm (8 in). On 11 November 2021, a maximum temperature of 44.0 °C (111.2 °F) was registered.

Mariental

Climate chart (precipitation, max. and min. temperature)
J	F	M	A	M	J	J	A	S	O	N	D
37 35 20	59 34 20	44 32 18	15 29 13	2 26 8	2 23 4	0 23 3	0 25 5	1 29 9	7 31 13	13 34 16	14 35 19
- █ Average max. and min. temperatures in °C
- █ Precipitation totals in mm
- Source: World Climate Guide
Imperial conversion
J	F	M	A	M	J	J	A	S	O	N	D
1.5 95 68	2.3 93 68	1.7 90 64	0.6 84 55	0.1 79 46	0.1 73 39	0 73 37	0 77 41	0 84 48	0.3 88 55	0.5 93 61	0.6 95 66
- █ Average max. and min. temperatures in °F
- █ Precipitation totals in inches

== Economy ==
The nearby Hardap Dam is the second largest reservoir in Namibia and provides water for irrigation, making it possible to cultivate animal fodder, as well as corn, fruits, and vegetables. The town is surrounded by flourishing commercial farms, which, due to the low annual rainfall in the area, focus on game farming as well as sheep and ostrich farming, which, along with cattle farming, remain popular in the region. Export grapes, cotton, lucerne, and dairy farming are also sustained by irrigation from the Hardap Dam.

The Hardap Correctional Facility in Mariental is one of Namibia's seven major prisons.

A local ostrich abattoir used to cater for this increasingly important industry, but recently went bankrupt. What survives of the karakul trade in the south is also centered around Mariental. Sitting astride the main route into the Kalahari and Namib Deserts, Mariental serves the needs of farmers in these areas. Mariental boasts some of the best safari and hunting experiences in Namibia at lodges like Lapa Lange and Anib Lodge. Available game includes springbuck, blesbuck, giraffe, ostrich, leopard, zebra, kudu, gemsbuck, hartebeest, eland, blue- and black wildebeest.

The German association “Fahrräder für Afrika e.V..” (Bicycles for Africa) has built a “Bicycle Empowerment Centre” in the town together with the Catholic Aids Action (CAA) and the Bicycling Empowerment Network (BEN) Namibia. Local people infected with HIV were trained to repair and build bikes, and also received training on how to run the workshop on their own. Second-hand Bicycles are being sold at low prices to the inhabitants of the region, allowing easy travel and transportation, while the income from the workshops is used to finance local aid projects. The project is supported by governmental agencies in Germany and Namibia.

== Politics ==
Mariental is governed by a municipal council that has seven seats.

The first local election run after Namibian independence, the 1992 local elections, was won by SWAPO which obtained 1,579 votes and gained four seats. The Democratic Turnhalle Alliance (DTA) came second with 1,181 votes and three seats. The 1998 local authority elections saw a similar result. SWAPO won and gained four seats (796 votes), the DTA gained three seats (524 votes).

The 2015 local authority election was won by the SWAPO which gained six seats (1,325 votes). The remaining seat went to the DTA (139 votes). The 2020 local authority election was won by the newly formed Landless People's Movement (LPM), which scored well all over Hardap. LPM gained 1,726 votes and four seats in the city council, followed by SWAPO with two seats (906 votes). The new Independent Patriots for Change (IPC) obtained the remaining seat with 180 votes.
