= Fish River (Namibia) =

Coordinates: 28°08′S 17°11′E

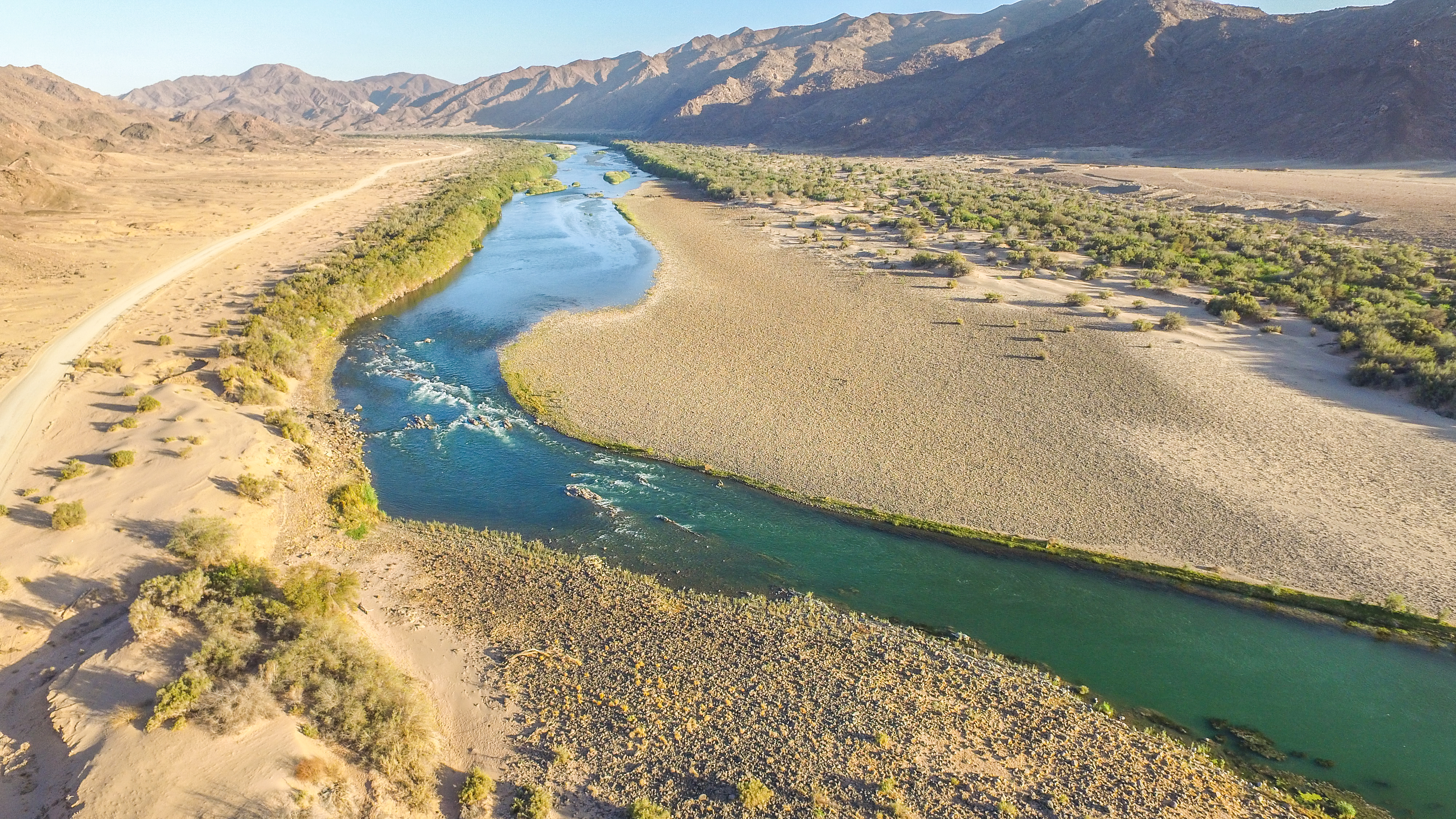
- The Fish River in August during winter.

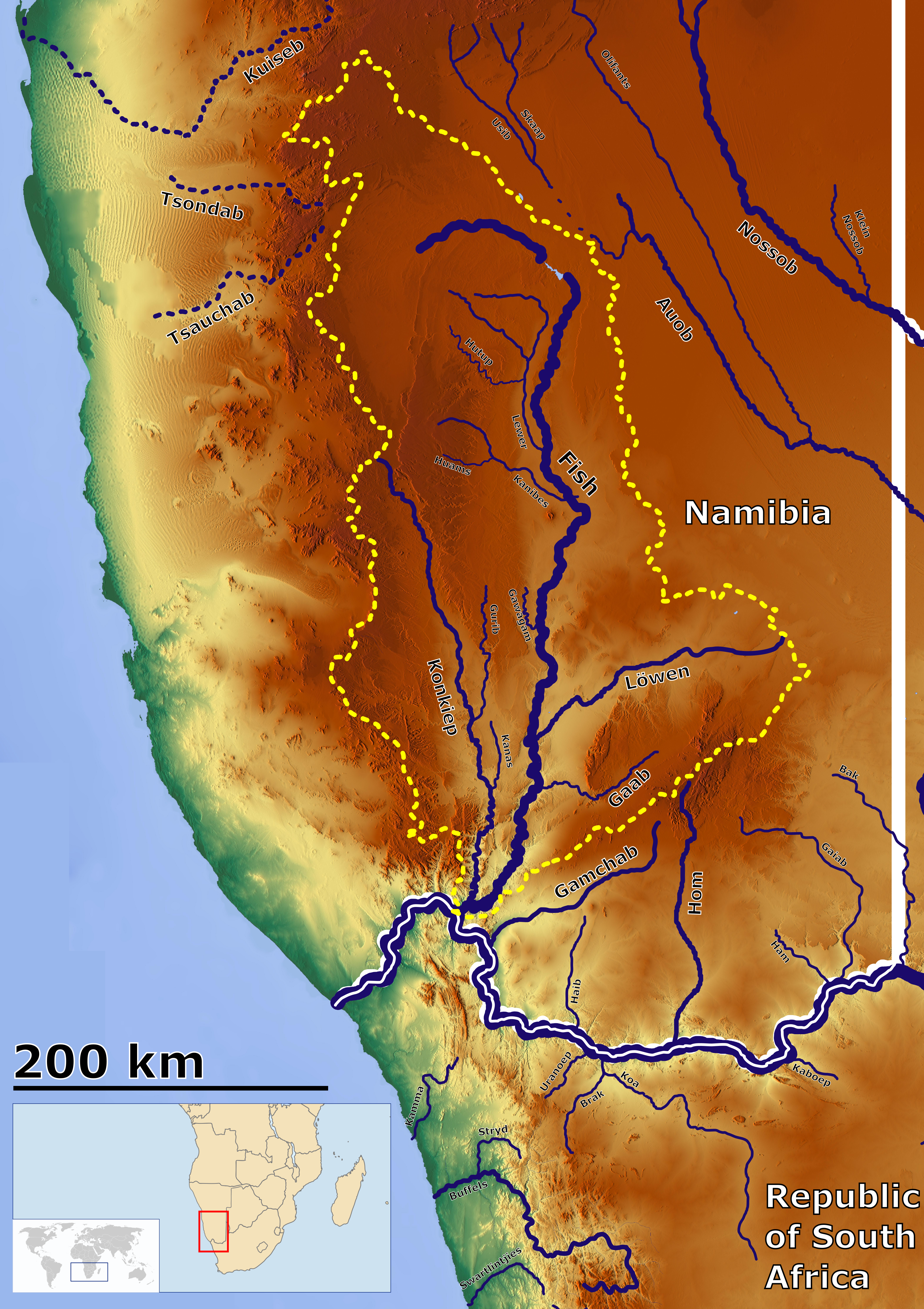
- The Fish River Basin

Location
- Country: Namibia

Physical characteristics
- Source
  - location: Near Mariental
- Mouth: Orange River
- Length: 650 km (400 mi)

The Fish River (Visrivier in Afrikaans, Fischfluss in German) is a river in Namibia. It is 650 km long, flowing from the Naukluft Mountains 150 km to the Hardap Dam near Mariental. From there the flow is entirely blocked, all further flow downstream coming from tributaries downstream from the dam. The flow of the river is seasonal; in winter the river can dry up completely. The river is the site of the spectacular Fish River Canyon, Africa's largest canyon, which is 160 km long, and at points as much as 550 m deep.

The outflow of the Fish River joins the Orange River at the border with South Africa about 100 km from the Atlantic Ocean.

== Gallery ==
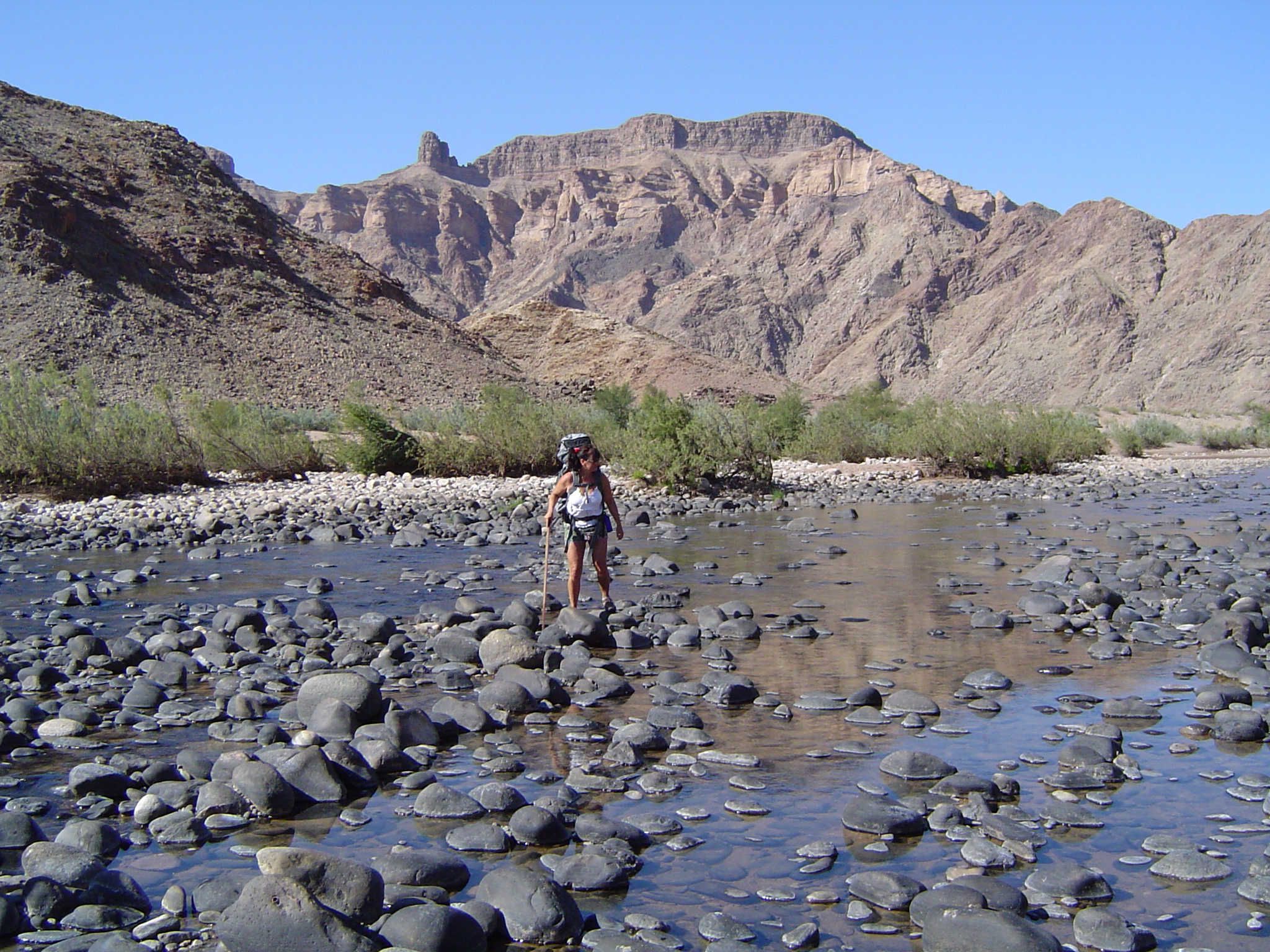
Fish River crossing

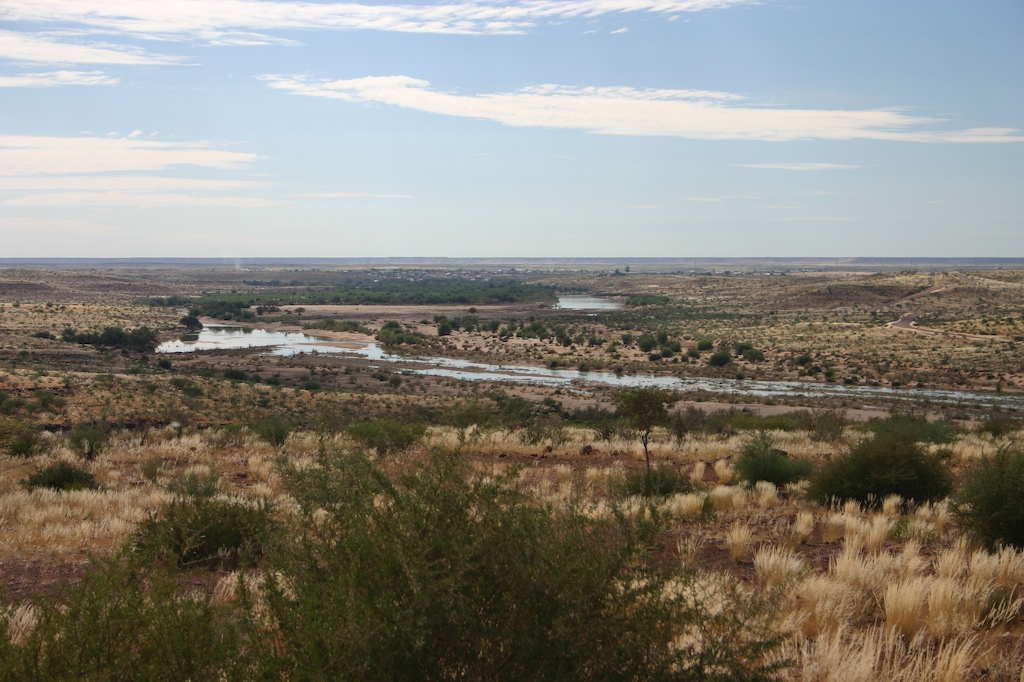

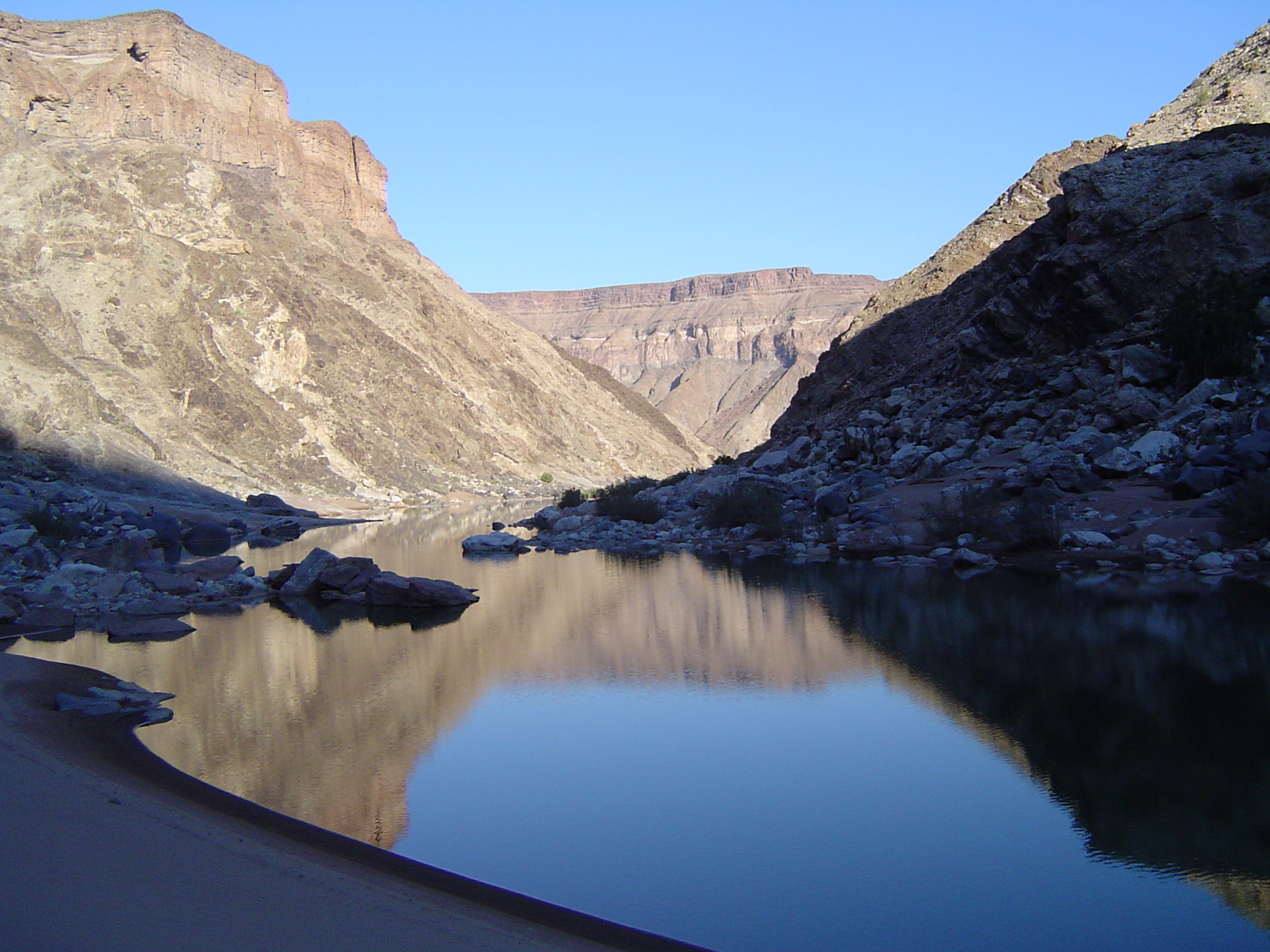

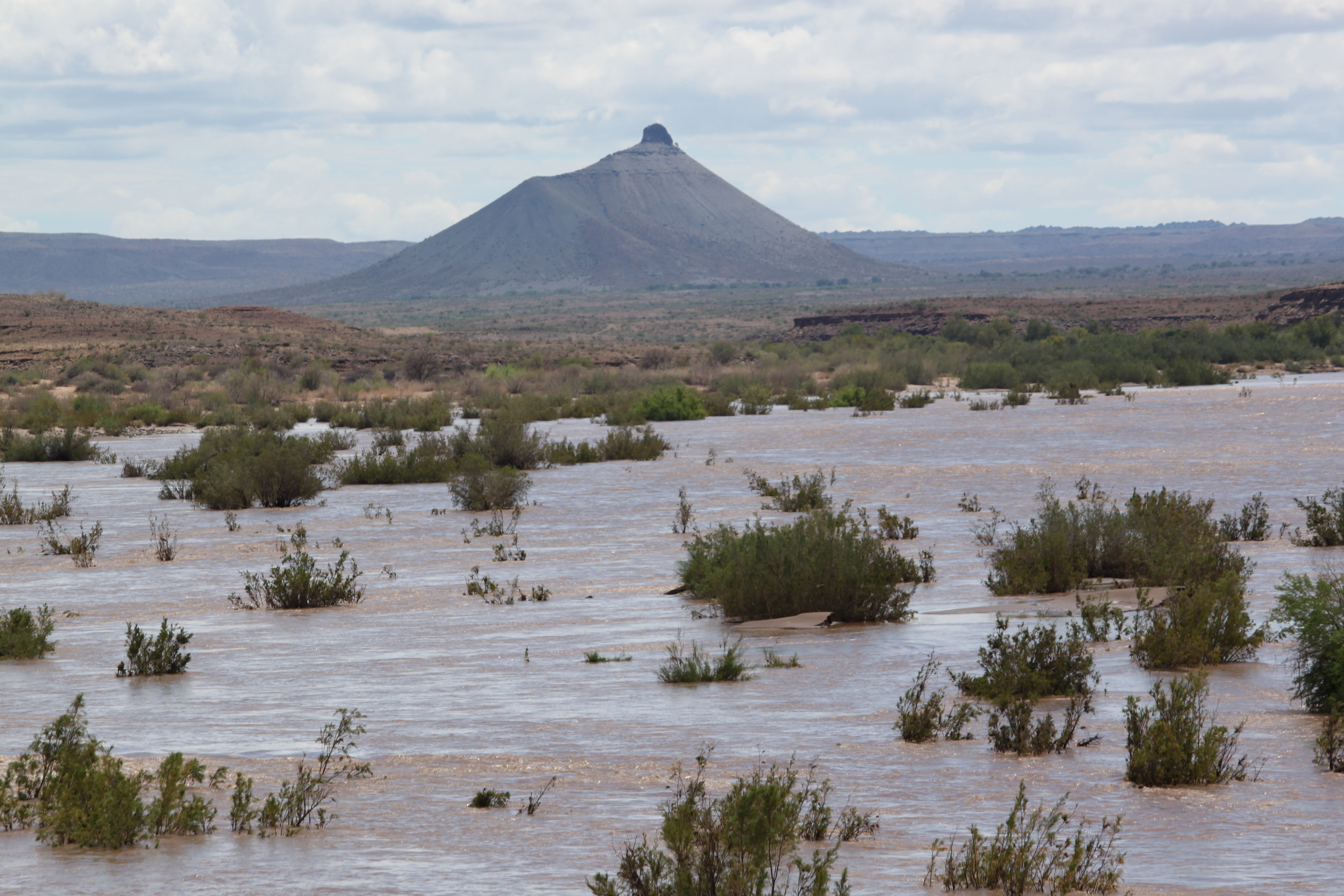

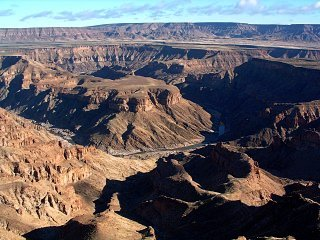
