= Otjikondo =

- Location within Namibia
- Coordinates: 19.848°S 15.469°E
- Country: Namibia
- Region: Kunene
- Time zone: UTC+1 (SAST)

Otjikondo is a settlement with post office, shops and hotel, in the Kunene Region of north-western Namibia. It is situated on the C40 to Kamanjab, 83 km (52 mi) north-west of Outjo.

The name Otjikondo is from the Herero language and means 'place of the kondo-coloured cattle', i.e. red or black with a strip of white across the back. Otjikondo is home to Otjikondo School Village, a primary school where learners board throughout the year. This school was Kunene's best performing school between 2009 and 2011.
