= Tsaris Pass =

Mountain pass in Namibia

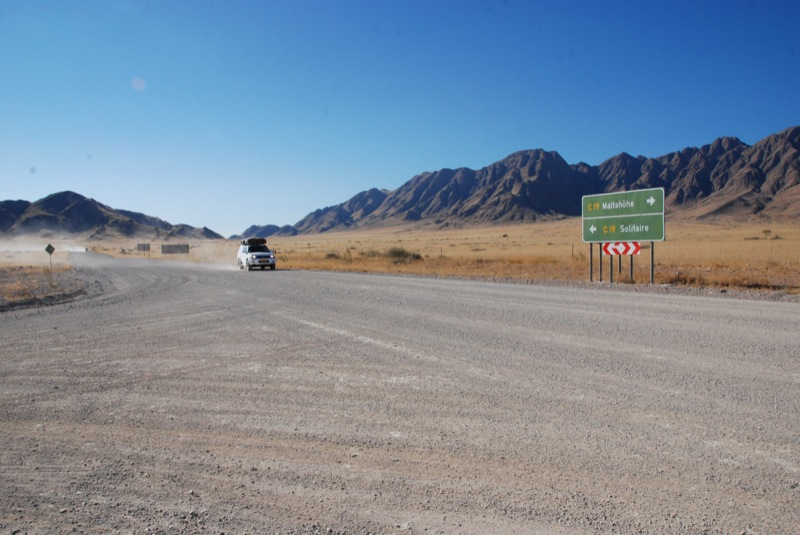
C19 between Maltahöhe and Solitaire

The Tsaris Pass is a mountain pass in the Hardap Region of central Namibia. It is situated west of Maltahöhe on the C19 road through the Tsaris Mountains in the Namib Desert in the direction of Sossusvlei, Sesriem, and Solitaire. Although the road has a grade of 1:18, it is unsuitable for trailers. This section of the C19 frequently is in bad condition. Tourists are advised not to attempt it without a 4x4.
