= C19 road (Namibia) =

Secondary route in Namibia

C19 road

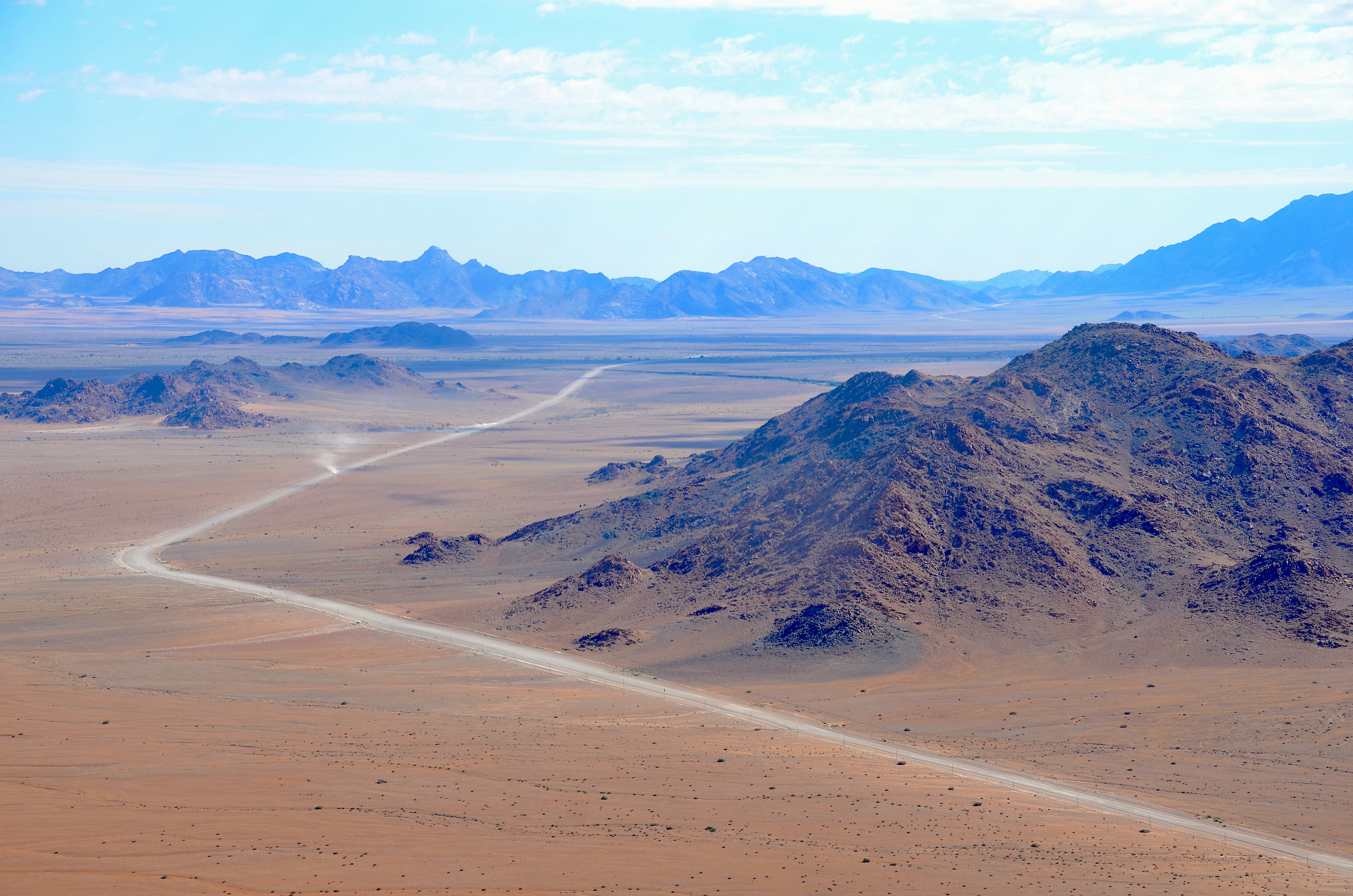
- Main road C19 near Sesriem

Major junctions
- South end: B1 at Mariental
- C21 near Maltahöhe; C14 at Maltahöhe; C27 near Sesriem
- North end: C14 at Solitaire

Location
- Country: Namibia

Highway system
- Transport in Namibia
← C18	→ C20

The C19 is a partially tarred road in the Hardap and Khomas Regions of central Namibia. It connects Mariental with several tourist destinations at and around Solitaire. It is 341 km (212 mi) long.

The untarred portion starts in Solitaire, forking off as an alternative route to the C14 road. It runs south and then east until it meets the C14 road again at Maltahöhe. About halfway between Solitaire and Maltahöhe the C19 climbs to an elevation of 1,672 metres (5,486 ft) over Tsaris Pass. This road section frequently is in bad condition, tourists are advised not to attempt it without a 4x4.

The tarred portion runs east from Maltahöhe to the B1 road on the outskirts of Mariental. The highway is 332 kilometres (206 mi) long.
