= C14 road (Namibia) =

Secondary route in Namibia

C14 road

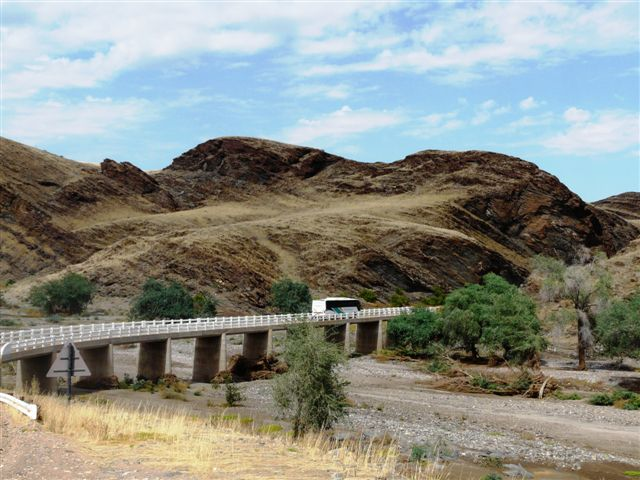
- The C14 crossing over the Kuiseb River Canyon. The bridge was built in 1965

Major junctions
- South end: B4 at Goageb
- C13 at Helmeringhausen; C19 at Maltahöhe; C24 near Solitaire; C19 at Solitaire; C26 near the Kuiseb River Canyon
- North end: B2 in Walvis Bay

Location
- Country: Namibia
- Villages: Helmeringhausen, Solitaire, Bethanie

Highway system
- Transport in Namibia
← C13	→ C15

The C14, also the MR 36, is an untarred road in Namibia.

== Geography ==
The C14 starts in Walvis Bay and goes south-east through Solitaire, Maltahöhe, Helmeringhausen and ends in Goageb. It is 643 kilometres (400 mi) long and rises up to an altitude of 1,528 metres (5,013 ft) above sea level. The steepest gradient is 1:9.

The C14 is one of the major tourist routes in Namibia, leading to the tourist attractions Vogelfederberg, Kuiseb River and Canyon, Gaub River Canyon, the Tropic of Capricorn road sign (23°30′00″S 15°46′19″E), Solitaire and Helmeringhausen. It touches the Namib-Naukluft National Park and also serves an access road to Sossusvlei, Sesriem, Duwisib Castle, and the Fish River Canyon.

== C14 Challenges ==
The C14 is frequently in bad condition, with tourist travel by sedan "not advisable". Even though it would also be a much shorter connection between the major ports of Lüderitz and Walvis Bay, there are no plans to tar this road due to fears of unsustainability.
