= C27 road (Namibia) =

Secondary route in Namibia

C27 road

Major junctions
- North-West end: Sesriem
- South-East end: C13 near Helmeringhausen

Location
- Country: Namibia

Highway system
- Transport in Namibia
← C26	→ C28

The C27 is a secondary route in Namibia that runs from Sesriem, in the Namib, to the C13 junction near Helmeringhausen. It is 237 kilometres (147 mi) long and rises up to an altitude of 1,717 metres (5,633 ft) above sea level.

The C27 is untarred, and often heavily corrugated. Travel by 4x4 vehicle is advised for tourists. It leads through the Namib Desert past the Namibrand Nature Reserve and the Namib-Naukluft National Park. At its northern terminus at Sesriem is the entrance leading to the Sossusvlei.
