= Uibes =

Uibes (also ǀUibes and Uibis) is an unproclaimed settlement of about 500 people in the Hardap Region in southern central Namibia. It is situated on Hudup River 100 kilometres (62 mi) from Mariental on the gravel road between Gibeon and Maltahöhe and belongs to the Daweb electoral constituency.

== History ==
On 21 December 1904, in the first year of the Herero and Namaqua War, Uibes was the scene of a battle between the Bethanie Nama people and the German colonisers of South-West Africa. The Germans won the battle; the inhabitants fled the area.

In 1971 the South African administration formed tribal homelands known as bantustans. Uibes became part of Namaland, forming its most western point. Members of the ǀKhowesin (Witbooi Orlam) tribe were forcibly resettled here. They established Edward Frederick Primary School in 1978 and form the core of Uibes' community today.

== Development and infrastructure ==
Uibes is marked by poverty and neglect. Although the settlement has been electrified around 2010 residents cannot afford to pay for that service. Water is supplied by a borehole equipped with a wind pump. When there is no wind, water supply is interrupted. The majority of the inhabitants are elderly people surviving on old-age grants.

The roads connecting Uibes to neighbouring towns are poorly maintained. Commercial activities include gardening in the riverbed of the ephemeral Hudup River, and small livestock farming.
