= Kalkrand =

Kalkrand Khoekhoe: ǃHanās
- Village
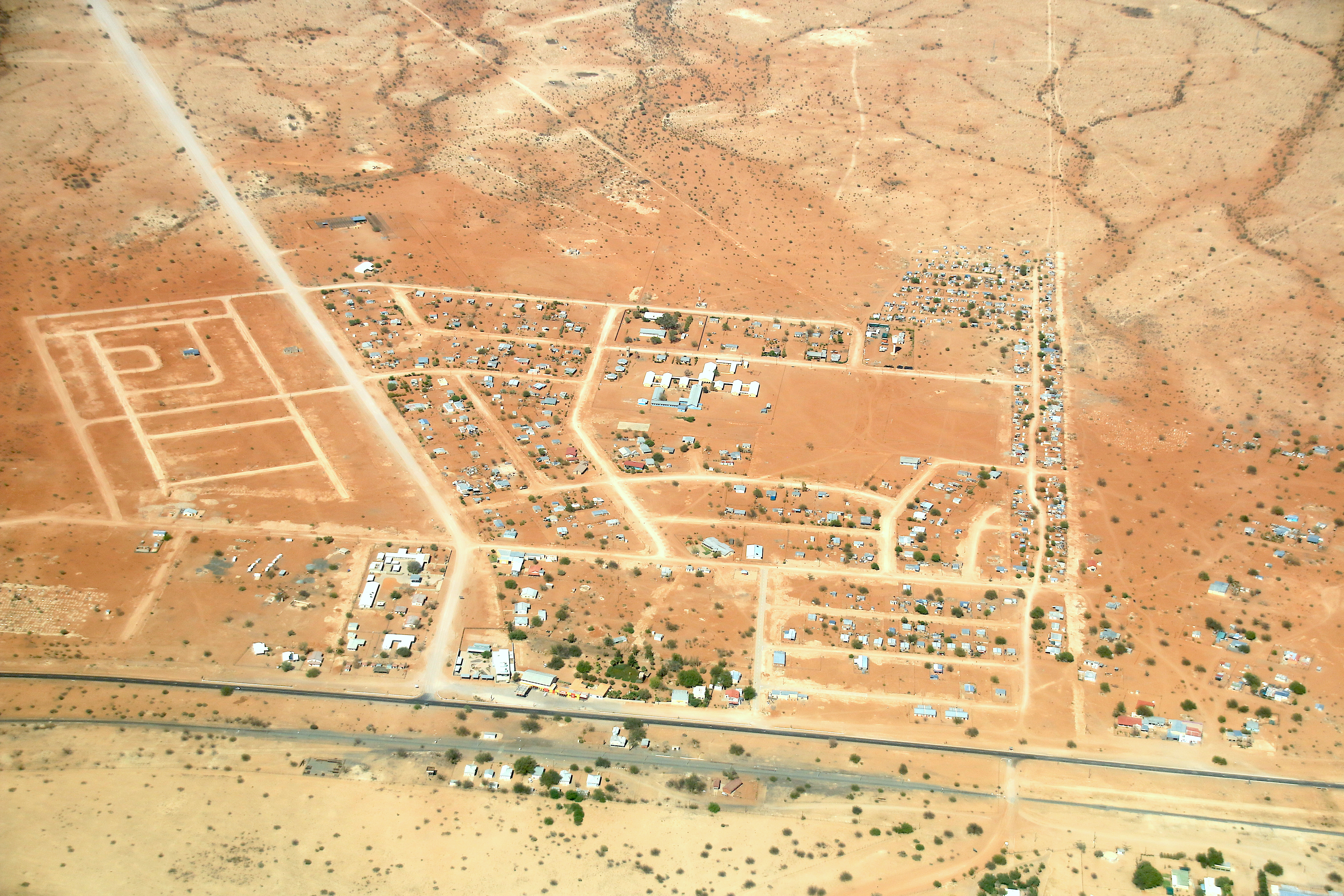
- Aerial view of Kalkrand (2019)

- Location within Namibia
- Coordinates: 24°04′S 17°35′E
- Country: Namibia

Population (2023)
  - Total: 1,602
- Time zone: UTC+2 (South African Standard Time)
- Climate: BWh

Kalkrand is a village in the Hardap Region of southern central Namibia. It had 1,602 inhabitants in 2023.

== Geography ==
Kalkrand is situated between Rehoboth and Mariental on the national road B1. The regional road C21 connects it to Maltahöhe and Hoachanas. The village features a petrol station, schools, a police station and a public clinic. Kalkrand is riddled with poverty and unemployment. Inhabitants mainly live from small livestock and cattle farming.

Historical population
Year	Pop.	±% p.a.
2011	830	—
2023	1,602	+5.63%

== Politics ==
Kalkrand is governed by a village council that has five seats.

Upon Namibian independence Kalkrand was governed by a seven-seat village council. The first local election run after independence, the 1992 local elections, was won by the Democratic Turnhalle Alliance (DTA) which obtained 293 votes and gained five seats. SWAPO came second with 148 votes and two seats. The 1998 local authority elections saw a much narrower result. DTA obtained four seats with 133 votes, SWAPO got the remaining thee seats with 131 votes.

The 2015 local authority election was won by the SWAPO party which gained four seats (399 votes). The remaining seat went to the Rally for Democracy and Progress (RDP) which obtained 121 votes). The 2020 local authority election was won by the newly formed Landless People's Movement (LPM) which scored well all over Hardap. LPM gained 312 votes and two seats, followed by SWAPO, also with two seats (234 votes). The likewise new Independent Patriots for Change (IPC) won 97 votes and the remaining village council seat.
