= C21 road (Namibia) =

Secondary route in Namibia

C21 road

Major junctions
- South end: C19 near Maltahöhe
- B1 at Kalkrand
- North end: C15 at Hoachanas

Location
- Country: Namibia

Highway system
- Transport in Namibia
← C20	→ C22

C21 is a secondary route in Namibia that runs from Maltahöhe to Hoachanas via Kalkrand. It is 173 kilometres (107 mi) long.

The C21 crosses the Fish River approx. 20 km (12 mi) southeast of Kalkrand at the abandoned settlement of Kub. A memorial to the Battle of Kub (1904) can be seen from the road, along with remains of old buildings.
