= C26 road (Namibia) =

Secondary route in Namibia

C26 road

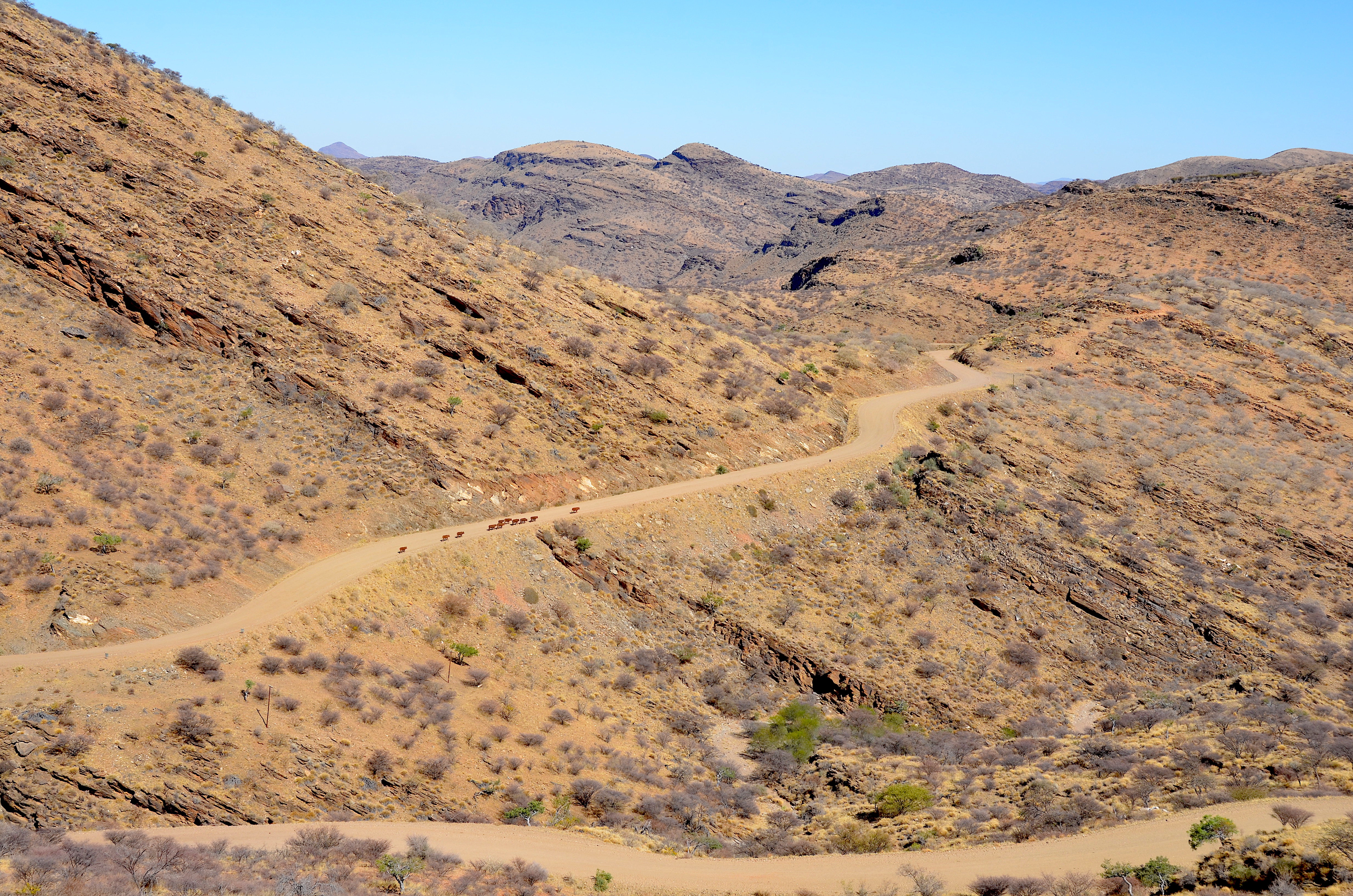
- Gamsberg Pass

Major junctions
- North-East end: B1 Windhoek
- South-West end: C14 near Rostock

Location
- Country: Namibia

Highway system
- Transport in Namibia
← C25	→ C27

The C26 is a secondary route in Namibia that runs from south-central Windhoek, at the B1 road junction, to the Namib-Naukluft National Park. It is 192 kilometres (119 mi) long and terminates at the C14 road near farm Rostock. It provides an alternative route from the capital to Walvis Bay but is untarred outside Windhoek. For tourists travel by 4x4 is recommended. 30 kilometres (19 mi) outside Windhoek is the Kupferberg Pass at a maximum elevation of 2,050 metres (6,730 ft). About halfway the C26 leads further through the Gamsberg Pass, descending from an elevation of 1,867 metres (6,125 ft) into the Namib desert.

Where C26 and B1 intersect in Windhoek, they are both referred to as Mandume Ndemufayo Avenue.
