= Dune 45 =

Dune in the Namib Desert, Namibia

Coordinates: 24°43′S 15°28′E

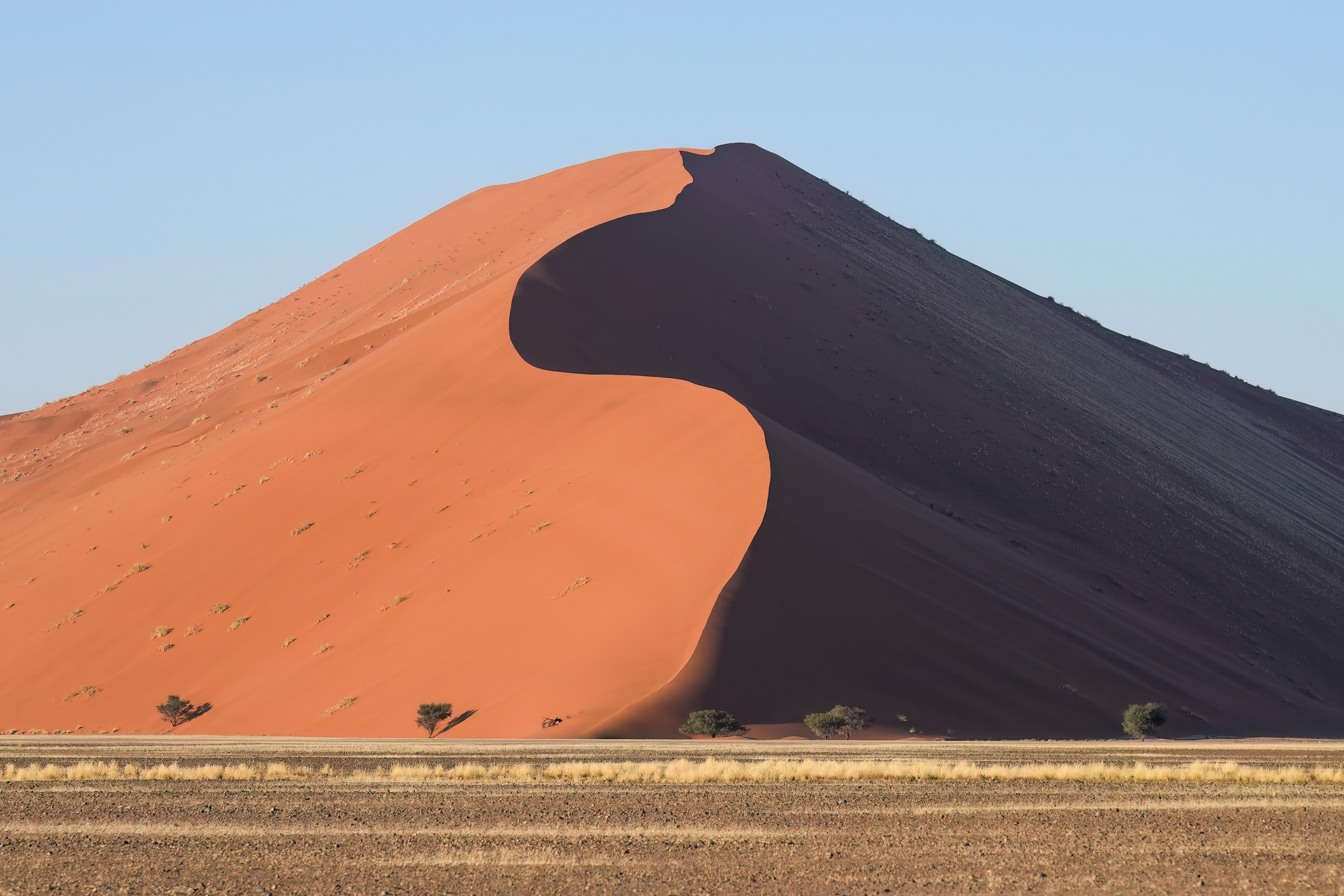
View of Dune 45 at sunrise

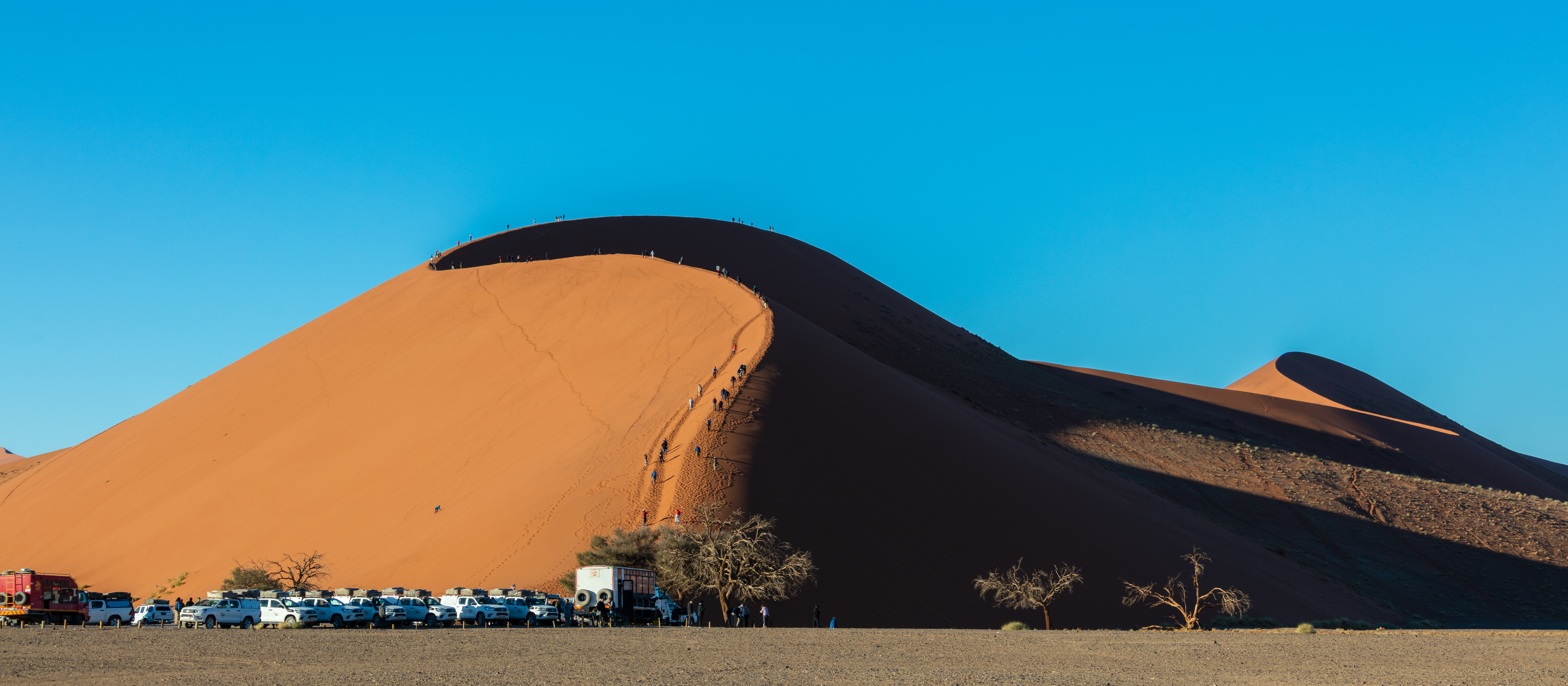
Dune 45

Dune 45 is a star dune in the Sossusvlei area of the Namib Desert in Namibia. Its name comes from the fact that it is at the 45th kilometre of the road that connects the Sesriem gate and Sossusvlei. Standing over 170 m, it is composed of 5-million-year-old sand that is detritus accumulated by the Orange River from the Kalahari Desert and then blown here.

Because it is near the road the dune is often photographed, particularly early and late in the day when one side of the dune is in shadow. It is often climbed by visitors to Sossusvlei.
