= C13 road (Namibia) =

Secondary route in Namibia

C13 road

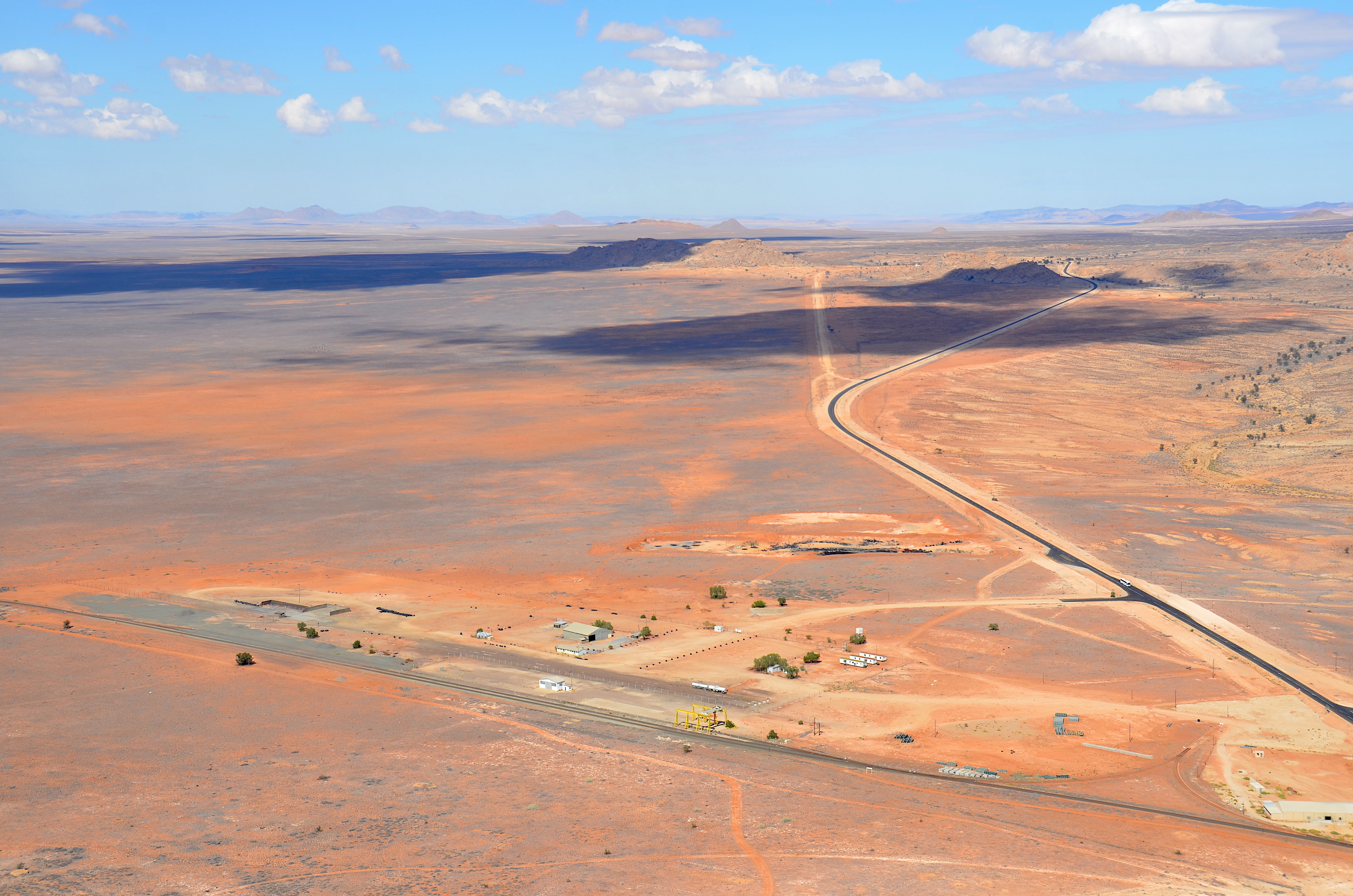
- The C13 at Aus

Major junctions
- South end: B1 near the South African border at Noordoewer
- C37 near Aussenkehr; MR 118 near Rosh Pinah; B4 at Aus; C27 near Helmeringhausen
- North end: C14 at Helmeringhausen

Location
- Country: Namibia

Highway system
- Transport in Namibia
← C12	→ C14

The C13 is a regional road in the ǁKaras Region of southern Namibia. It starts in Helmeringhausen, crosses the B4 road at Aus, leads past Rosh Pinah to the Orange River and then follows the river until Noordoewer where it joins the B1 road, 3.6 kilometres (2.2 mi) away from the Vioolsdrif border. The C13 is 427 kilometres (265 mi) long.

The C13 is untarred except for several interrupted stretches between Aus and Rosh Pinah which were established to test the reduction of dust exposure due to heavy traffic on this road, caused by trucks to the mines at Rosh Pinah. The section between Aussenkehr and Rosh Pinah has the additional designation district road DR 212. During the raining season this section is often in a bad condition, and sometimes altogether closed if the water level of the Orange River is too high.
