= Daweb Constituency =

Electoral constituency in the Hardap region of central Namibia

Daweb constituency (red) in the Hardap Region

Daweb Constituency is an electoral constituency in the Hardap Region of Namibia. It was created in August 2013, following a recommendation of the Fourth Delimitation Commission of Namibia, and in preparation of the 2014 general election. Daweb constituency was formed from the western part of Gibeon Constituency.

Daweb Constituency covers an area of 40,210 km^{2} (15,530 sq mi). It had a population of 6,092 in 2023. The administrative centre is the village of Maltahöhe. It also contains a number of small settlements, among them Uibes. As of 2020 the constituency had 3,297 registered voters.

== Politics ==
In the 2015 regional elections Herculus Jantze of Swapo won the constituency with 853 votes, followed by the independent candidate Adam Johannes Baisako (199 votes), Paul Lucas Simon of the Democratic Party of Namibia (DPN, 108 votes) and Anna Lukas of the Democratic Turnhalle Alliance (DTA, 80 votes). The 2020 regional election was won by Nicodemus Jesajas Motinga of the Landless People's Movement (LPM, a new party registered in 2018). He obtained 963 votes. The sitting councillor Jantze (SWAPO) came second with 628 votes.

== See also ==
- Administrative divisions of Namibia
