= Officers' House, Maltahöhe =

Officers' House
- German: Offiziershaus
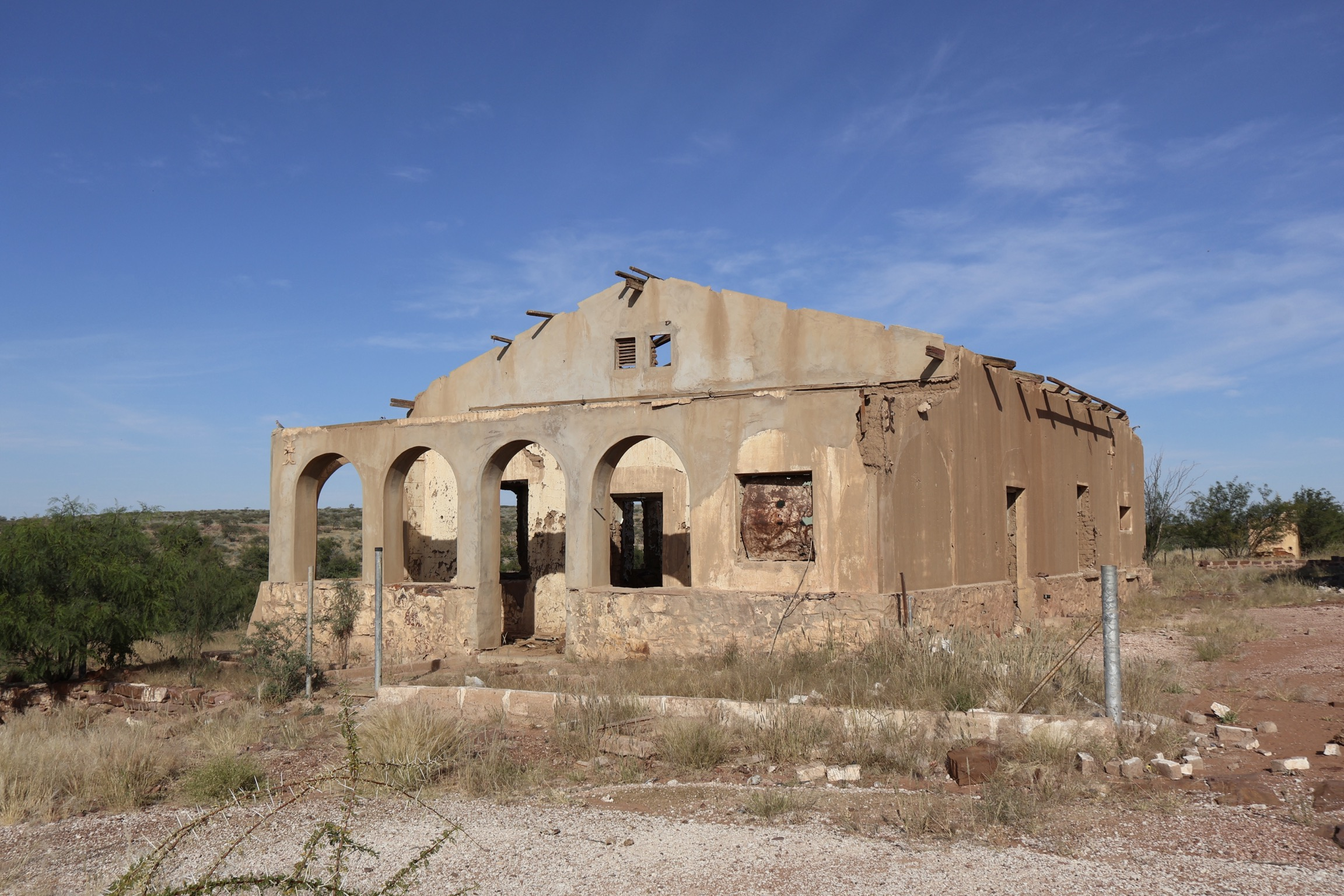
- Ruins of the building in May 2025.
- Interactive map of the Officers' House area

General information
- Location: Maltahöhe, Namibia
- Coordinates: 24°50′44″S 16°58′41″E
- Completed: Around 1904

The Officers' House (German: Offiziershaus) is a historic building in the village of Maltahöhe, Namibia. The building served as accommodation for German military officers during the early 20th-century colonial conflicts. Likely the village's first permanent structure, today it stands largely hidden behind the Maltahöhe Hotel in a state of disrepair.

== History ==
The Officers’ House in Maltahöhe was likely the settlement's first permanent structure, built sometime before or during the 1904–1905 conflict. That year, a series of uprisings erupted across German South West Africa, leading to the deployment of several hundred soldiers in Maltahöhe and the surrounding farms. As a result, local infrastructure was significantly expanded. According to the notes of pioneer Bernhardt, only two buildings stood in Maltahöhe in 1904, when it became a center of military operations. A soldier's account confirms that the Officers’ House was already standing by 1905.

The building's early features included windows made from the bottoms of wine bottles and a distinctive white turret, now no longer present. By 1909, the Maltahöhe Hotel had been erected in front of the Officers’ House; around 1911, the compound was expanded with the construction of an officers’ residence immediately to the west of the original house.

In the present, the building stands in a state of disrepair. Following the establishment of a local museum at Maltahöhe Hotel, in 2008, the hotel announced plans to restore the historic officers' house in collaboration with the Namibian Heritage Commission, incorporating it into the museum in the near future.
