= Helmeringhausen =

- Farmstead settlement
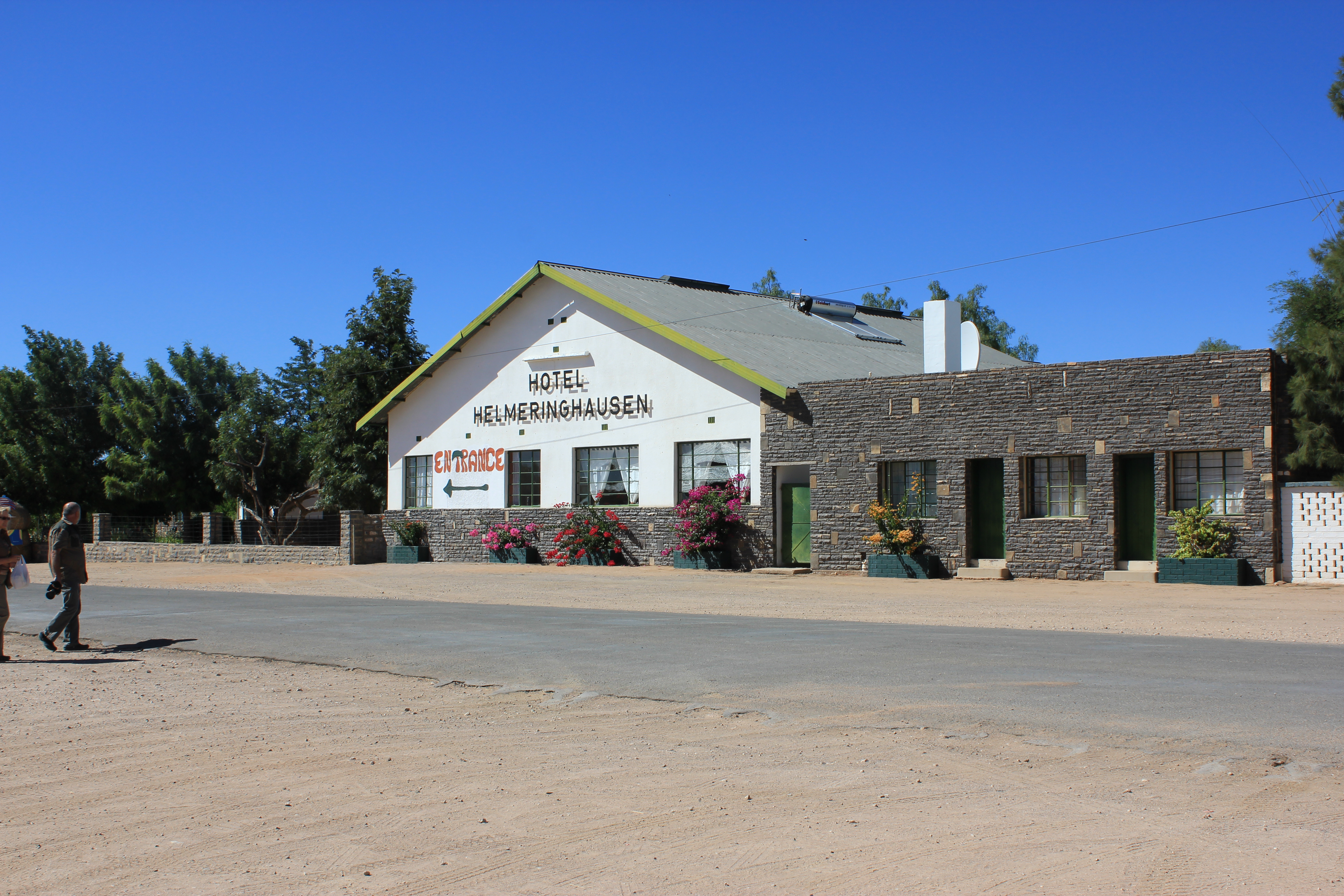
- Helmeringhausen Hotel, 2011

- Location in Namibia
- Coordinates: 25°53′S 16°49′E
- Country: Namibia
- Region: ǁKaras Region
- Constituency: Berseba Constituency
- Time zone: UTC+2 (South African Standard Time)

Helmeringhausen is a settlement in the ǁKaras Region of southern Namibia in the Berseba Constituency. It is located 200 km northeast of Lüderitz and 500 km south of Windhoek on the crossing of the national roads C14 (Goageb - Walvis Bay) and C13 (Rosh Pinah - Helmeringhausen), and the road D414 (Aus - Mariental).

Helmeringhausen does not have an official governing body nor status as it is completely situated on private land, and all infrastructure except the roads are part of Farm Helmeringhausen. It features a small airfield (ICAO code: FYHH), a country hotel, and a private agricultural museum.

Helmeringhausen was founded as a farm by a member of the Schutztruppe, the colonial armed force of Imperial Germany.
