= Solitaire, Namibia =

Solitaire
- Settlement
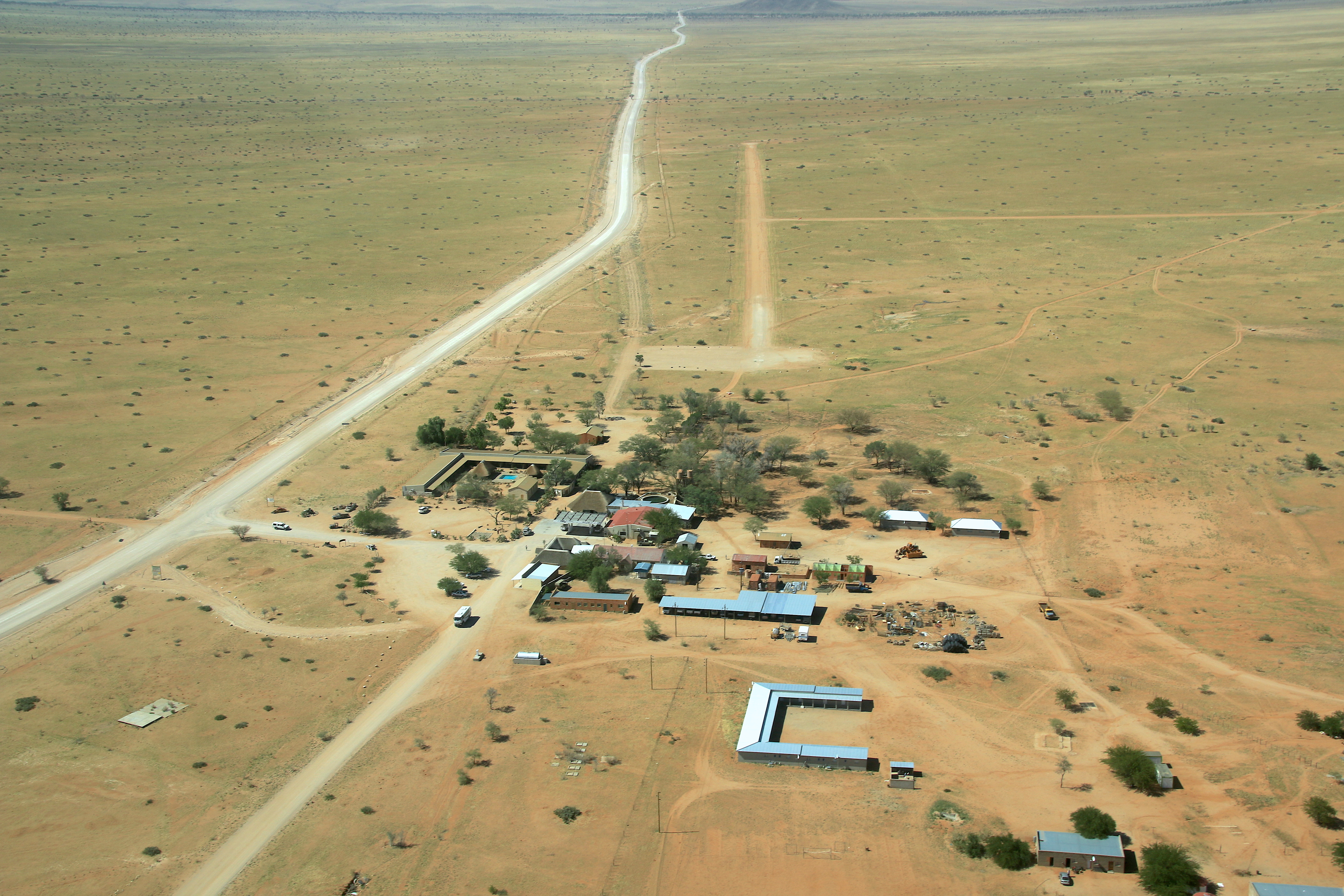
- Aerial view of Solitaire and runway

- Location in Namibia
- Coordinates: 23°53′S 16°0′E
- Country: Namibia
- Region: Khomas Region
- Constituency: Windhoek Rural Constituency
- Time zone: UTC+2 (South African Standard Time)

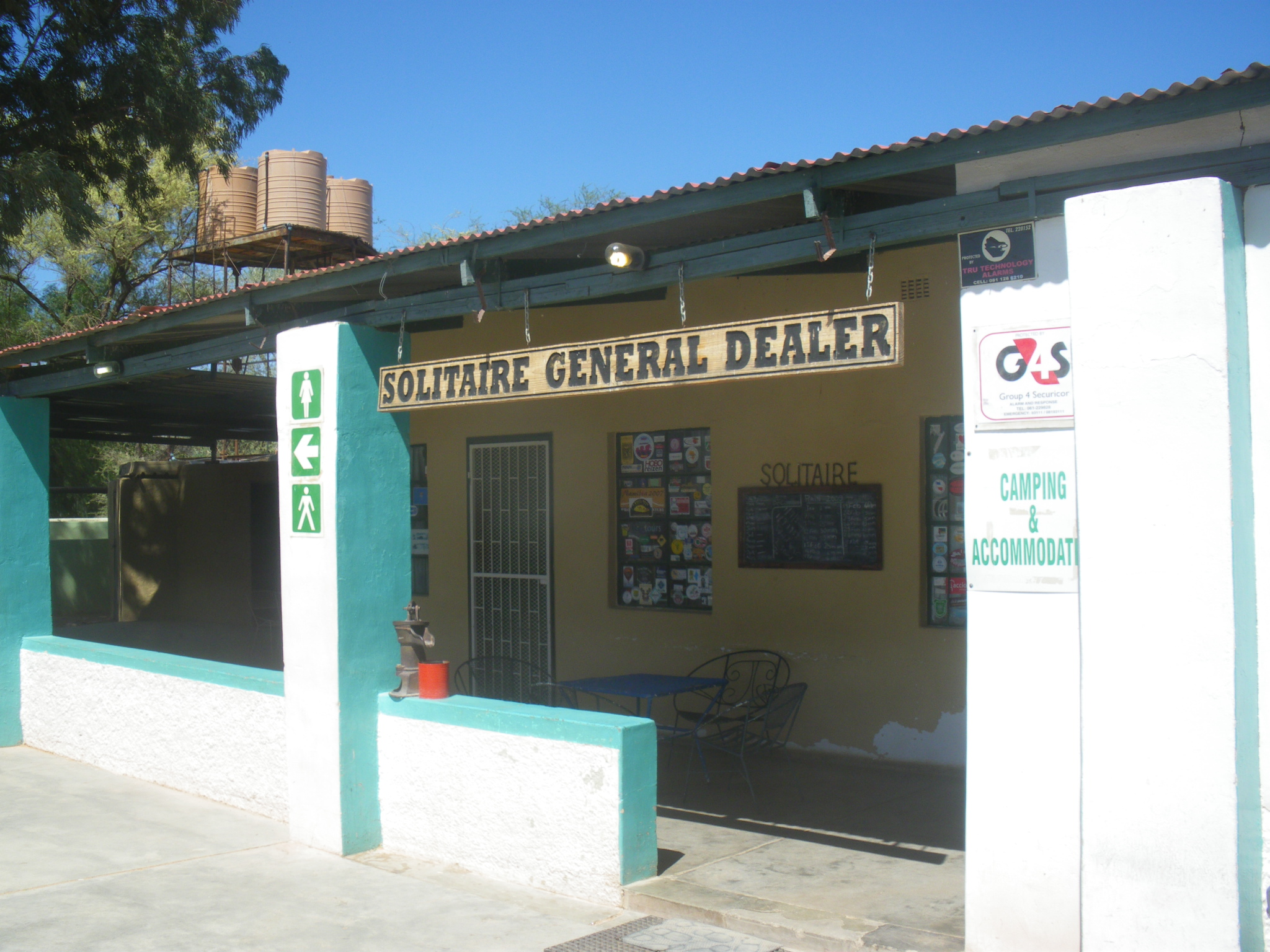
General dealer

Solitaire is a small settlement in the Khomas Region of central Namibia near the Namib-Naukluft National Park. It currently features the only gasoline station, bakery, cafe, and the only general dealer between the dunes at Sossusvlei and the coast at Walvis Bay, as well as on the road to the capital Windhoek. Solitaire belongs to the Windhoek Rural electoral constituency.

Solitaire is known in the Netherlands because of a book with the same name by Dutch author Ton van der Lee, dealing with his stay at the settlement.

== History ==
In 1948 Willem Christoffel van Coller bought 33,000 hectares of land from the South West Administration (the government of Namibia at the time) for the purpose of farming Karakul sheep. The land was previously an undeveloped area called Areb, situated between the Ababis region to the South and the Koireb region to the North.

The area was named Solitaire by Elsie Sophia van Coller (wife of Willem Christoffel van Coller). The name was chosen because of two meanings. Solitaire can mean a single set diamond and Solitaire can also mean solitude or loneliness. Combined these two meanings create the definition of being unique or one-of-a-kind and a precious but solitary place.

The first man-made structure on the Solitaire farm was a 2-room cottage constructed by Mr. Van Coller who also later constructed the main farm house, a stone kraal adjacent to the farmhouse and a dam wall across the river bed. Later he was responsible for constructing the current shop and installing the first petrol pump. The shop acted as the regional post office where weekly postbags were delivered. In 1948, construction of a small chapel was started; it was completed in 1951. The small Dutch-Reformed church is still in use by the local congregation. The church building is also used as a community meeting place, holding Farmer's Union meetings, elections, and health clinics. In 1968 the farm 'Solitaire' was sold to a Mr. Maritz, and has since gone through numerous owners. The two farms that make up Solitaire, the businesses, and other area land holdings, are now part of the 45,000 acre Solitaire Land Trust, which is focused on habitat preservation. This semi-arid region, frequented by drought, is home to healthy populations of wildlife, including the endemic Hartmann's mountain zebra. Farm Solitaire starts at the Great African Escarpment, an important watershed, and includes grasslands, gravel plains, ephemeral rivers and stretches to the edge of the Namib, one of the oldest deserts in the world.

== Tourism ==
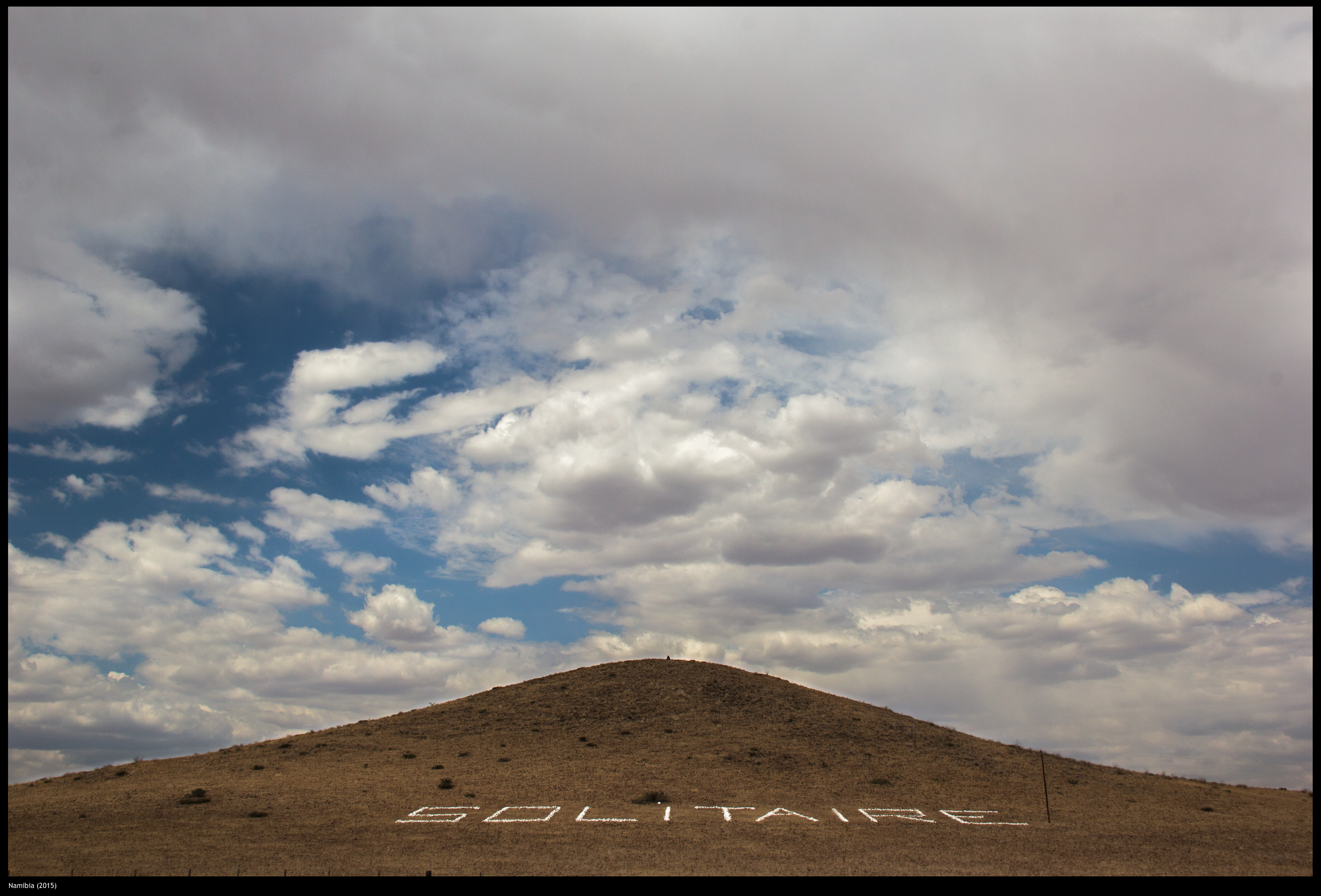
Hill at the entrance of Solitaire

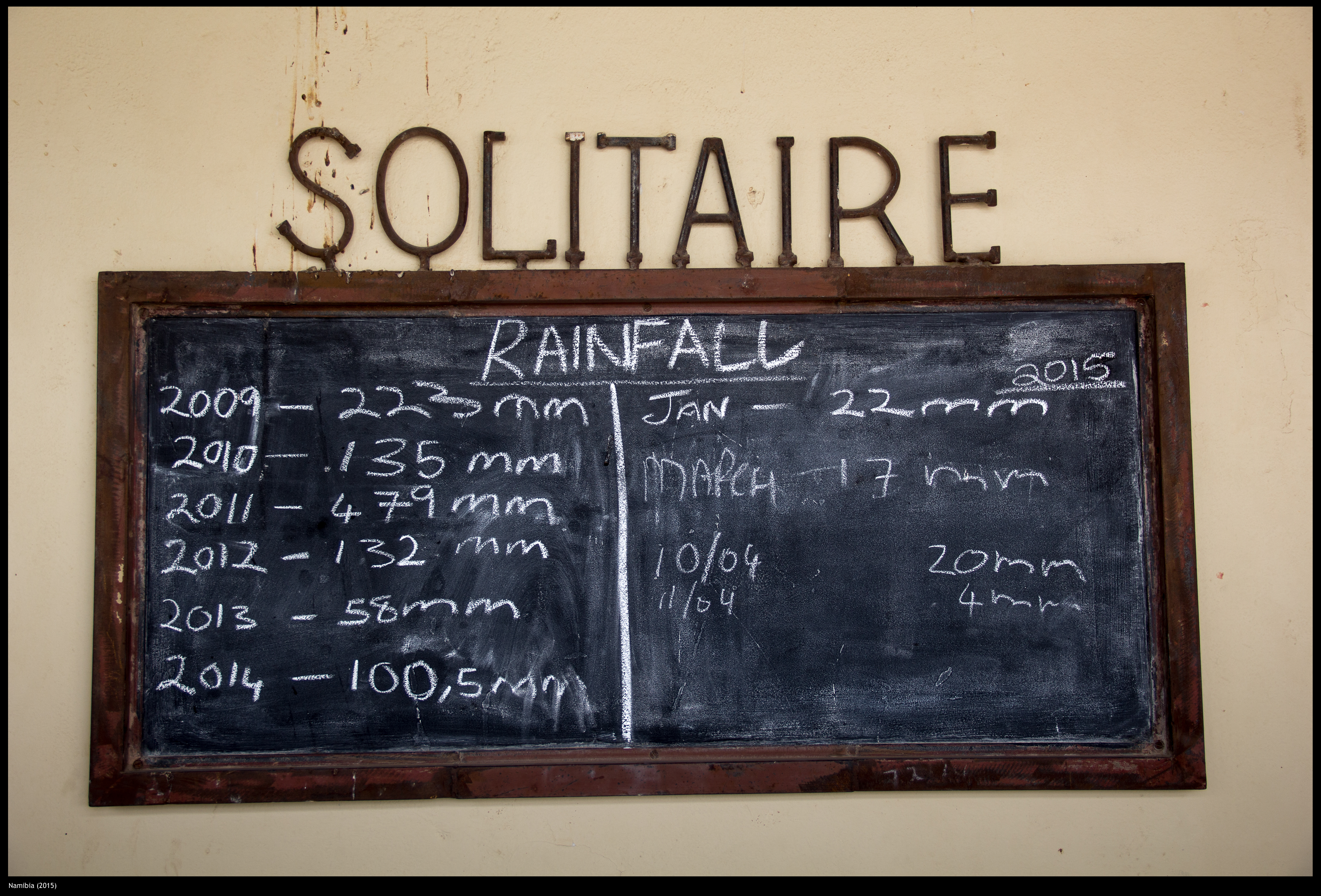
List of millimeters of rain that fell from 2009 to 2015 in Solitaire

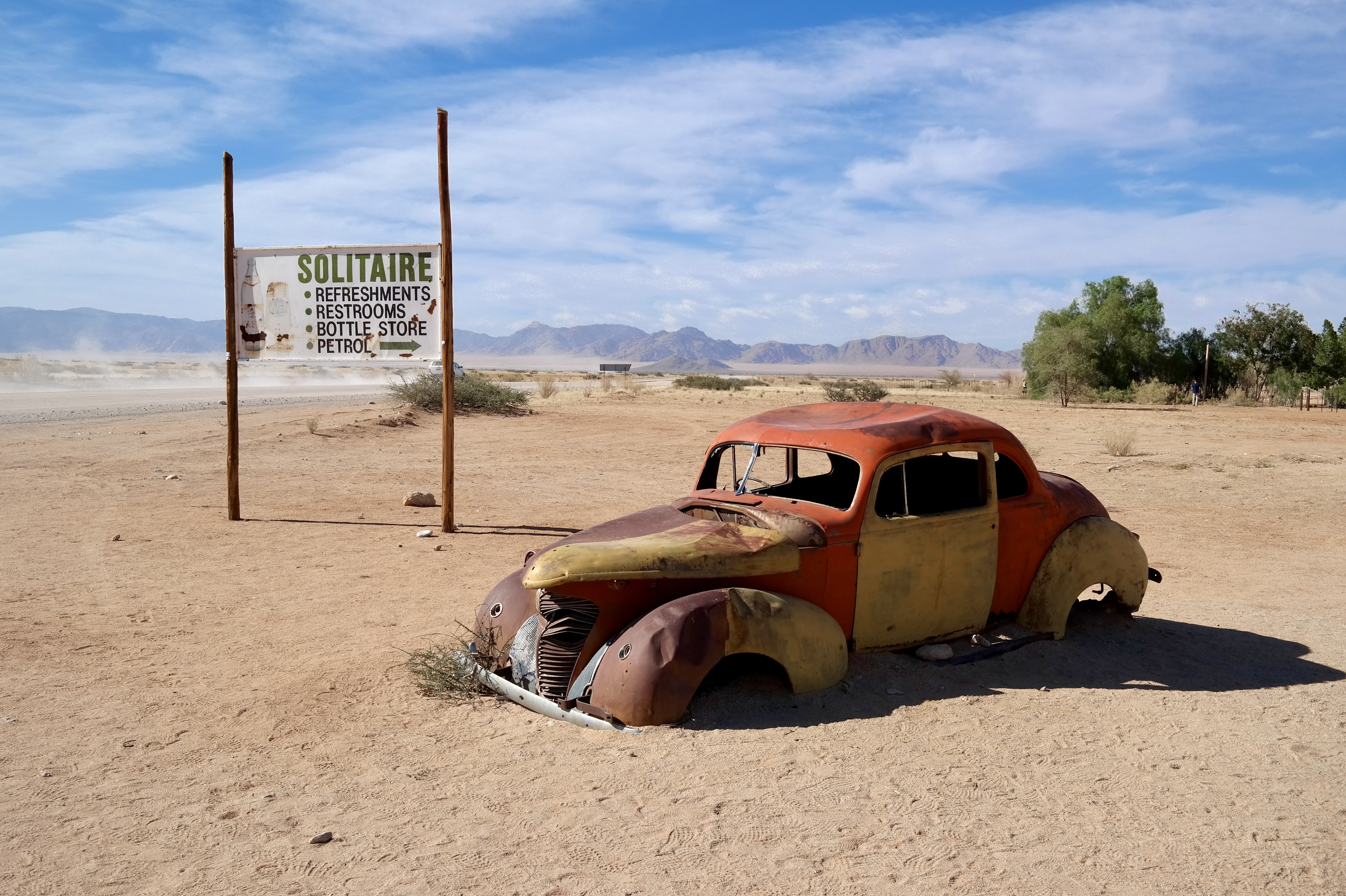
Vintage car wreck near the petrol station

Solitaire is situated at the junction of two main roads - C14 (Walvis Bay - Bethanie), and C19 (Sesriem - Sossusvlei), both major tourist routes through the Namib-Naukluft National Park. There is also a well-maintained, hard-sand air strip frequented by charter operators, private aviators and self-fly tourists. AVGas is available by prior arrangement.

As the surrounding area is sparsely populated it is a common stopover for tourists. In addition to the petrol station, public restrooms, restaurant and bakery, the settlement contains a tyre repair workshop and a motel, the Solitaire Lodge. The adjacent farm land accommodates the upmarket Solitaire Desert Farm, 7 km away.
