= Naukluft Mountains =

Mountain range in central Namibia

Coordinates: 24°10′S 16°10′E

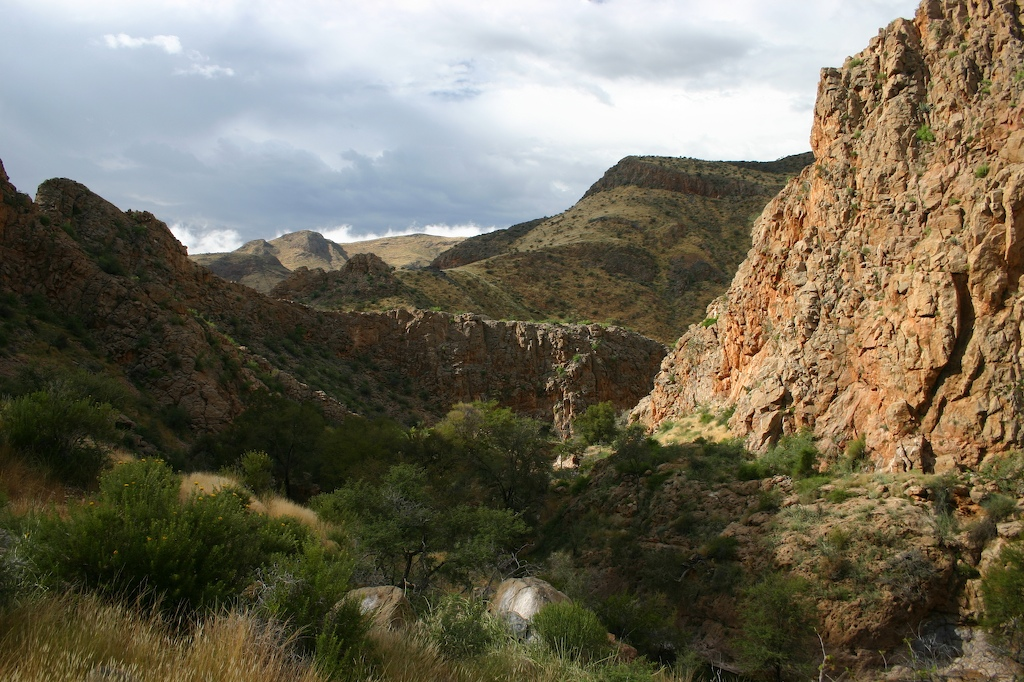
Waterkloof, a section of the Naukluft

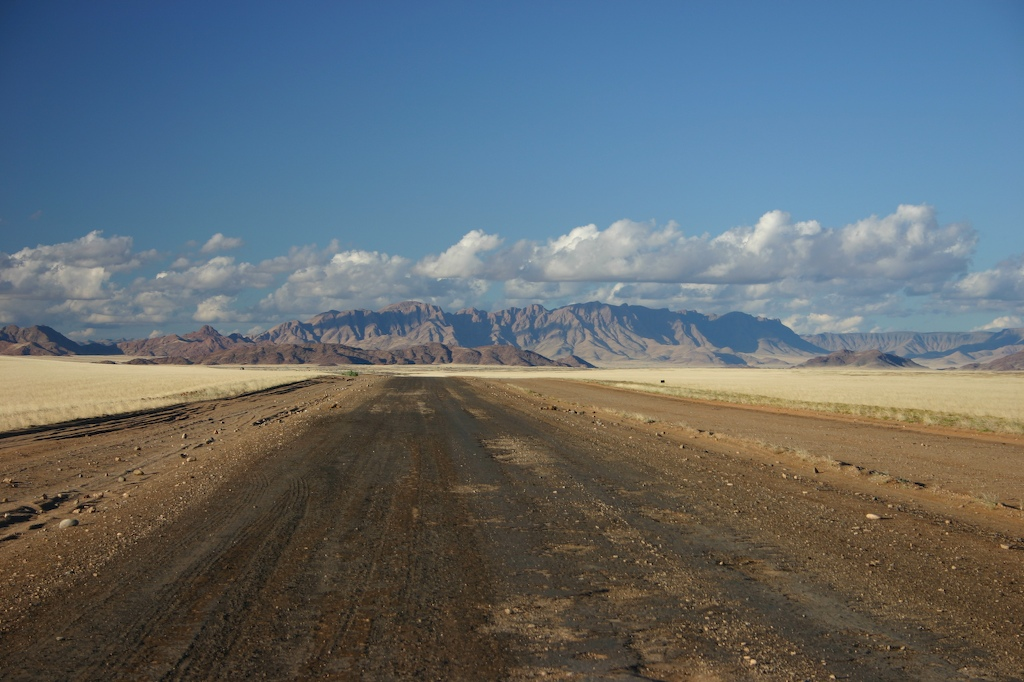
Naukluft, seen from Sesriem

The Naukluft Mountains (Afrikaans and German: Naukluftberge) are a mountain range in central Namibia. The southern part of the mountain range forms the easternmost part of the Namib-Naukluft National Park. The northern mountains are occupied by privately held farms. They are known for their wildlife, including mountain zebras and leopards. The mountains have many small streams and waterfalls.

Naukluft is the Namibian German rendering of the Afrikaans Noukloof, meaning "narrow ravine", from nou ('narrow', cf Dutch nauw) and kloof ('ravine', cf German Kluft).

== Geology ==
The Naukluft Mountains are a nappe complex: a stack of rock units which have been transported toward the southeast on a basal thrust fault. The first geological maps and cross-sections of the mountain range were made in the 1930s by Henno Martin and Hermann Korn. The rocks are interbedded sediments, dominated by dolomites, quartzites and shales, deposited in a shallow marine environment in the hinterland of the Damara orogeny between 700-500 million years ago. The sediments are equivalent in age to the Otavi Mountainlands sediments, where evidence for Snowball Earth climates was described by Paul F. Hoffman. The same lithologies are present in the Naukluft Mountains, but the sediments are folded and faulted, so the original stratigraphy is deformed and inverted.

The mountain range has been the site of numerous studies seeking to explain the mechanical paradox of overthrusts: How large thin units of rock may be pushed long distances over gently dipping thrust faults. The main basal thrust fault beneath the klippe which forms the mountain range contains an unusual polymineralic granular rock which has been described by some authors as an injected evaporite, and by others as a fault rock formed by alteration during earthquake slip. Most workers agree that the lubricating effect of this granular layer helped the thrust fault slip when the fault was active.
