= Maltahöhe =

- Village
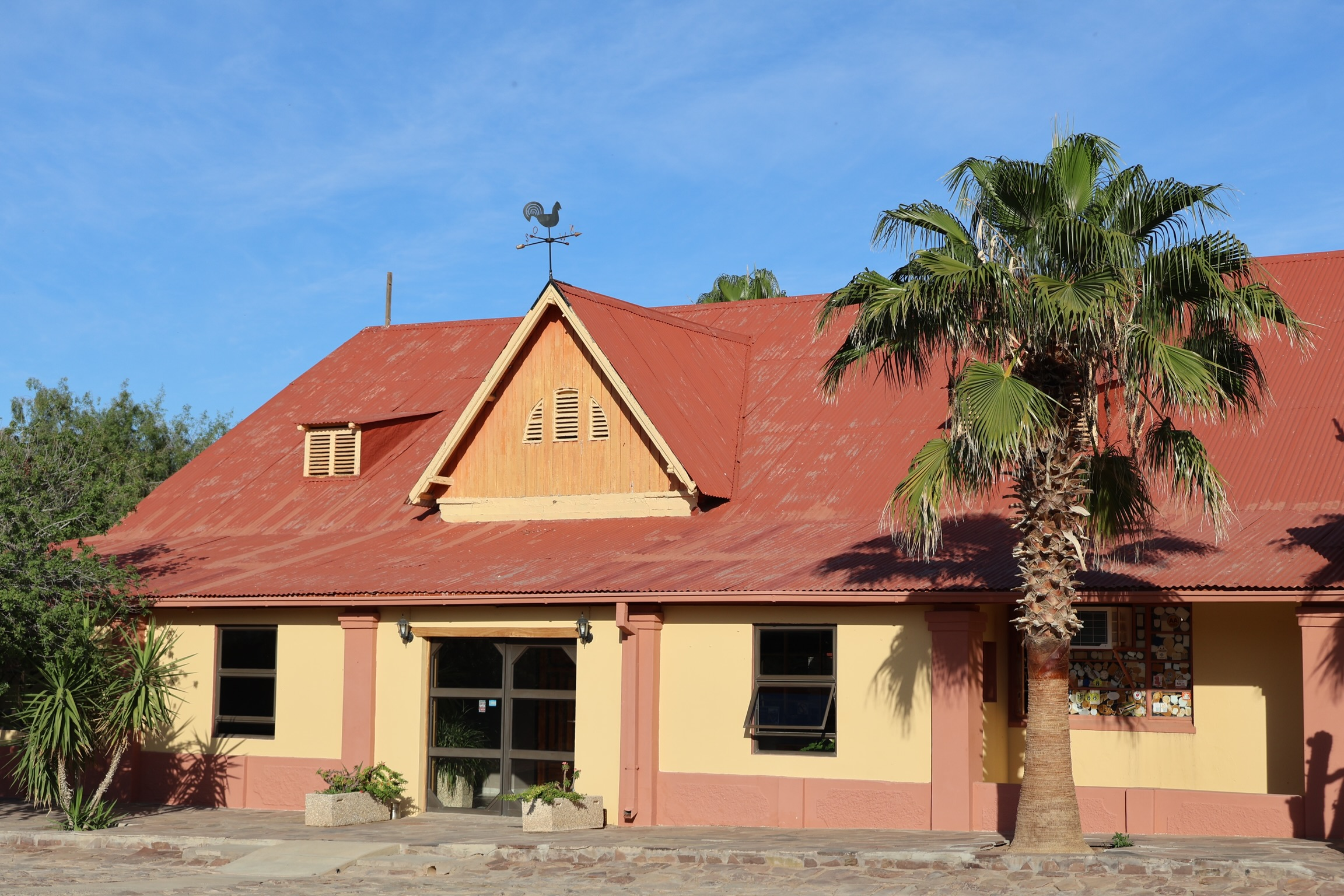
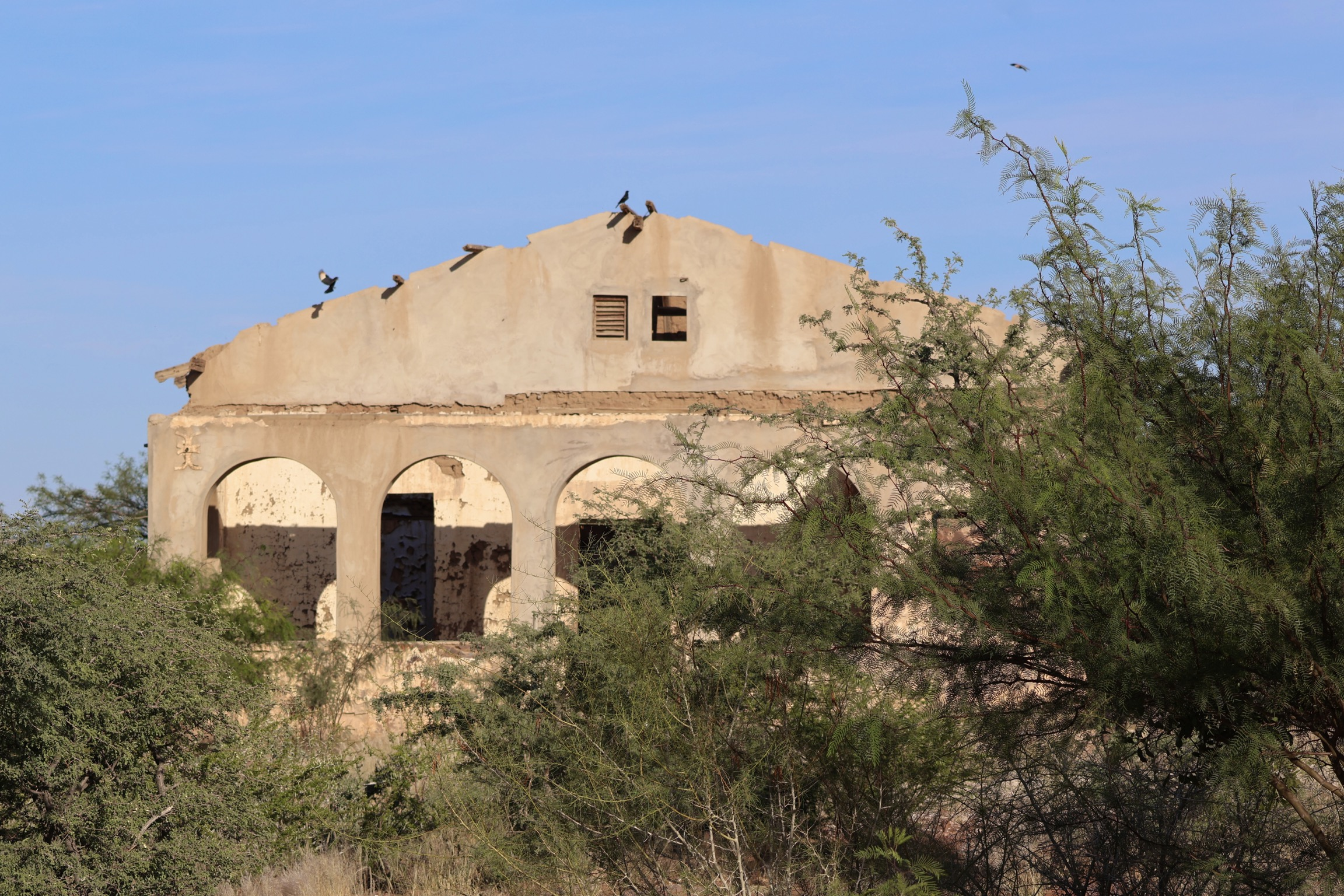
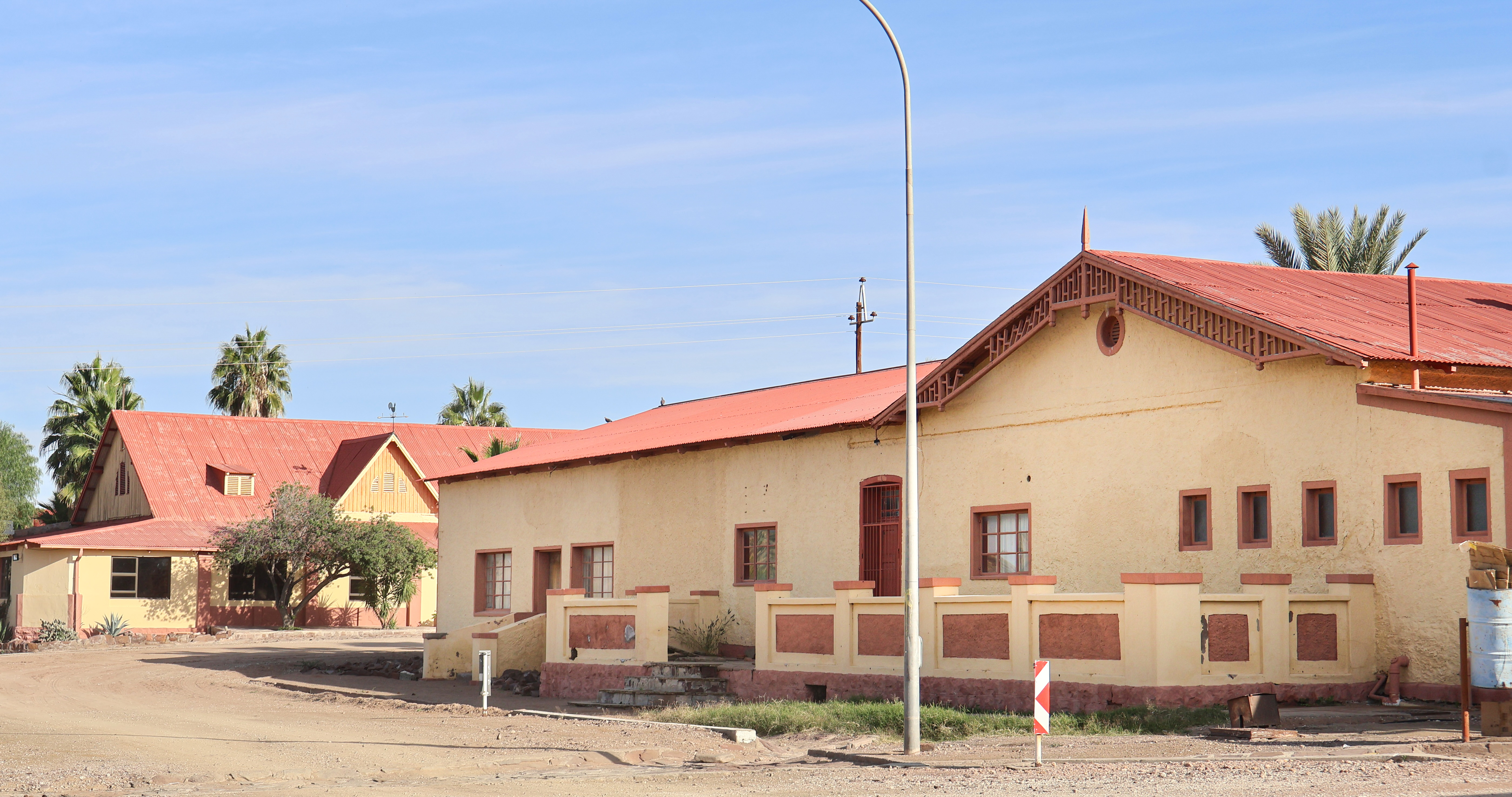
- Maltahöhe Hotel Officers' House Johan Albrecht Street

- Location in Namibia
- Coordinates: 24°50′S 16°59′E
- Country: Namibia
- Region: Hardap Region
- Constituency: Daweb Constituency

Population (2023)
  - Total: 3,464
- Time zone: UTC+2 (South African Standard Time)
- Climate: BWk

Maltahöhe (German pronunciation: [ˈmaltaˌhøːə]) is a village in southern central Namibia close to the Swartrand escarpment, about 110 km west of Mariental in the Hardap Region. It owns about 17,000 hectares of land and had 3,464 inhabitants in 2023. Maltahöhe is the administrative centre of Daweb Constituency.

== Geography ==
Maltahöhe lies at the intersection of the C14 from Walvis Bay to Goageb and the C19 from Mariental to Solitaire.

Maltahöhe has two suburbs, the Andreville location and the Blikkiesdorp (literally Afrikaans: Tin Town) informal settlement which has neither sewerage nor electricity supply.

Historical population
Year	Pop.	±% p.a.
2011	2,379	—
2023	3,464	+3.18%

== History ==
Maltahöhe was established in 1899 by Henning von Burgsdorff, previously an officer in the German Schutztruppe, the military force of the Imperial German occupation. Burgsdorff named the place after his wife Malta (1860-1947). After the end of the German colonial era in South West Africa the settlement became a small hub for tourism, serving as gateway to popular destinations like the Sossusvlei, Solitaire, Sesriem, and Duwisib Castle. The Maltahöhe Hotel was founded in 1907 and is the oldest country hotel in Namibia.

== Business and development ==
Maltahöhe owns 17,000 ha (42,000 acres) of land but has been in steady decline for a number of decades. There is no retail store in town; the last one stopped business before 1980. Until after the year 2000 Maltahöhe used to have town status. Due to mismanagement and infighting between councillors it was downgraded to "village". Since then many businesspeople have left and unemployment has risen. There is no secondary school, only a primary school and the Daweb Junior Secondary School.

The town used to be a centre for karakul sheep farming, but this branch of agriculture has likewise been shrinking. Unemployment is high with only about 500 residents in possession of some sort of job. Alcohol abuse is common, particularly in the suburbs.

== Politics ==
Upon Independence of Namibia Maltahöhe was a town, governed by a seven-seat town council. The first local election run after Namibian independence, the 1992 local elections, was won by SWAPO which obtained 702 votes and gained six seats. The Democratic Turnhalle Alliance (DTA) obtained the remaining seat with 168 votes. The 1998 local authority elections saw a similar result. SWAPO won and gained five seats (246 votes), the DTA won the other two seats with 100 votes.

Maltahöhe was downgraded to village in 2000. Since then it is governed by a village council that currently has five seats.

The 2010 local authority election was won by SWAPO which gained three seats. One seat each was won by the All People's Party (APP) and the Rally for Democracy and Progress (RDP). SWAPO also won the 2015 election and gained four seats (511 votes). The remaining seat went to the APP which obtained 109 votes.

The 2020 local authority election was won by the newly formed Landless People's Movement (LPM) which scored well all over Hardap. LPM gained 685 votes and three seats in the village council. SWAPO took the remaining two seats with 330 votes.
