= Namib =

Desert in Southern Africa

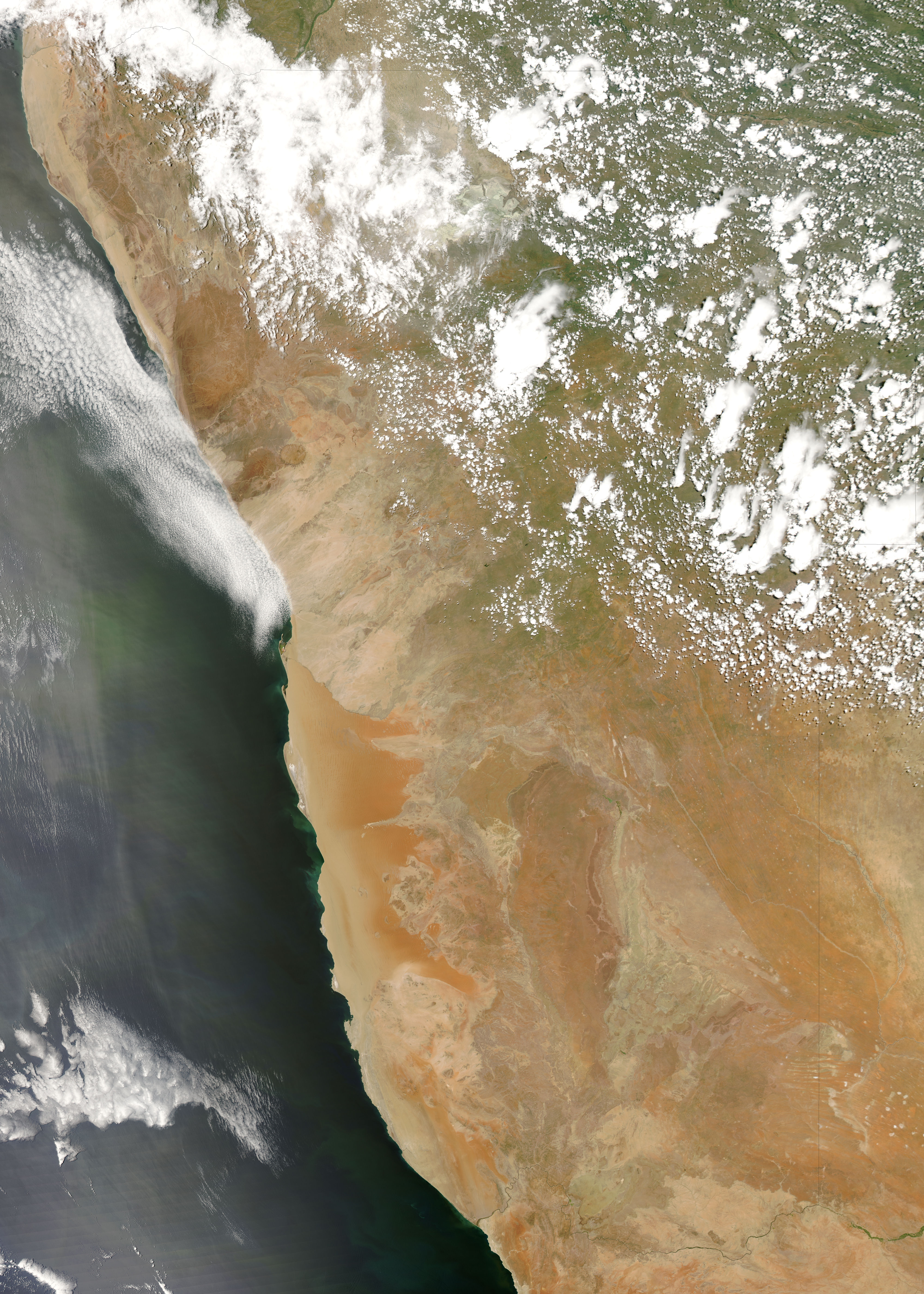
- An image of the Namib Desert by the MODIS instrument

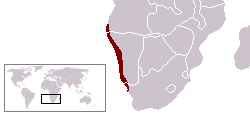
- Approximate boundaries of the Namib Desert
- Length: 1,600 km (990 mi)
- Width: 50–160 km (31–99 mi)
- Area: 160,000 km^{2} (62,000 mi^{2})

Geography
- Countries: Namibia; South Africa; Angola
- Coordinates: 24°45′07″S 15°16′35″E
- Rivers: List: Swakop River; Kuiseb River; Cunene River; Orange River; Olifants River; Tsauchab

UNESCO World Heritage Site
- Official name: Namib Sand Sea
- Criteria: Natural: vii, viii, ix, x
- Reference: 1430
- Inscription: 2013 (37th Session)
- Area: 3,077,700 ha (7,605,000 acres)
- Buffer zone: 899,500 ha (2,223,000 acres)

The Namib (/ˈnɑːmɪb/, NAH-mib; Portuguese: Namibe) is a coastal desert in Southern Africa. According to the broadest definition, the Namib stretches for more than 2,000 kilometres (1,200 mi) along the Atlantic coasts of Angola, Namibia, and northwest South Africa, extending southward from the Carunjamba River in Angola, through Namibia and to the Olifants River in Western Cape, South Africa. The Namib's northernmost portion, which extends 450 kilometres (280 mi) from the Angola-Namibia border, is known as Moçâmedes Desert, while its southern portion approaches the neighboring Kalahari Desert. From the Atlantic coast eastward, the Namib gradually ascends in elevation, reaching up to 200 kilometres (120 mi) inland to the foot of the Great Escarpment. Annual precipitation ranges from 2 millimetres (0.079 in) in the aridest regions to 200 millimetres (7.9 in) at the escarpment, making the Namib the only true desert in southern Africa. Having endured arid or semi-arid conditions for roughly 55–80 million years, the Namib may be the oldest desert in the world and contains some of the world's driest regions, with only western South America's Atacama Desert to challenge it for age and aridity benchmarks. (Note: It is hypothetized that Atacama Desert had climatic conditions that were akin to the Namib Desert prior to the rise of the Andes in the last 25 millions years when Atacama turned hyper-arid.) Most of Namibia's share of the Namib Desert is protected under the environmental protection included in the constitution of the country.

The desert geology consists of sand seas near the coast, while gravel plains and scattered mountain outcrops occur further inland. The sand dunes, some of which are 300 metres (980 ft) high and span 32 kilometres (20 mi) long, are the second-largest in the world after the Badain Jaran Desert dunes in China. Temperatures along the coast are stable and generally range between 9–20 °C (48–68 °F) annually, while temperatures further inland are variable—summer daytime temperatures can exceed 45 °C (113 °F) while nights can be freezing. Fogs that originate offshore from the collision of the cold Benguela Current and warm air from the Hadley cell create a fog belt that frequently envelops parts of the desert. Coastal regions can experience more than 180 days of thick fog a year. While this has proved a major hazard to ships—more than a thousand wrecks litter the Skeleton Coast—it is a vital source of moisture for desert life.

The Namib is almost completely uninhabited by humans except for several small settlements and indigenous pastoral groups, including the Ovahimba and Obatjimba Herero in the north, and the Topnaar Nama in the central region. Owing to its antiquity, the Namib may be home to more endemic species than any other desert in the world. Most of the desert wildlife is arthropods and other small animals that live on little water, although larger animals inhabit the northern regions. Near the coast, the cold ocean water is rich in fishery resources and supports populations of brown fur seals and shorebirds, which serve as prey for the Skeleton Coast's lions. Farther inland, the Namib-Naukluft National Park supports populations of mountain zebras, and other large mammals, and farther north, near the Skeleton Coast, lions, elephants and rhinos can be found. Although the outer Namib is largely barren of vegetation, lichens and succulents are found in coastal areas, while grasses, shrubs, and ephemeral plants thrive near the escarpment. Several types of trees are also able to survive the extremely arid climate.

== Etymology ==
The name Namib is of Khoekhoegowab (or Nama language) origin, and has been variously reported to mean "vast place" and "an area where there is nothing".

== Geography and geology ==
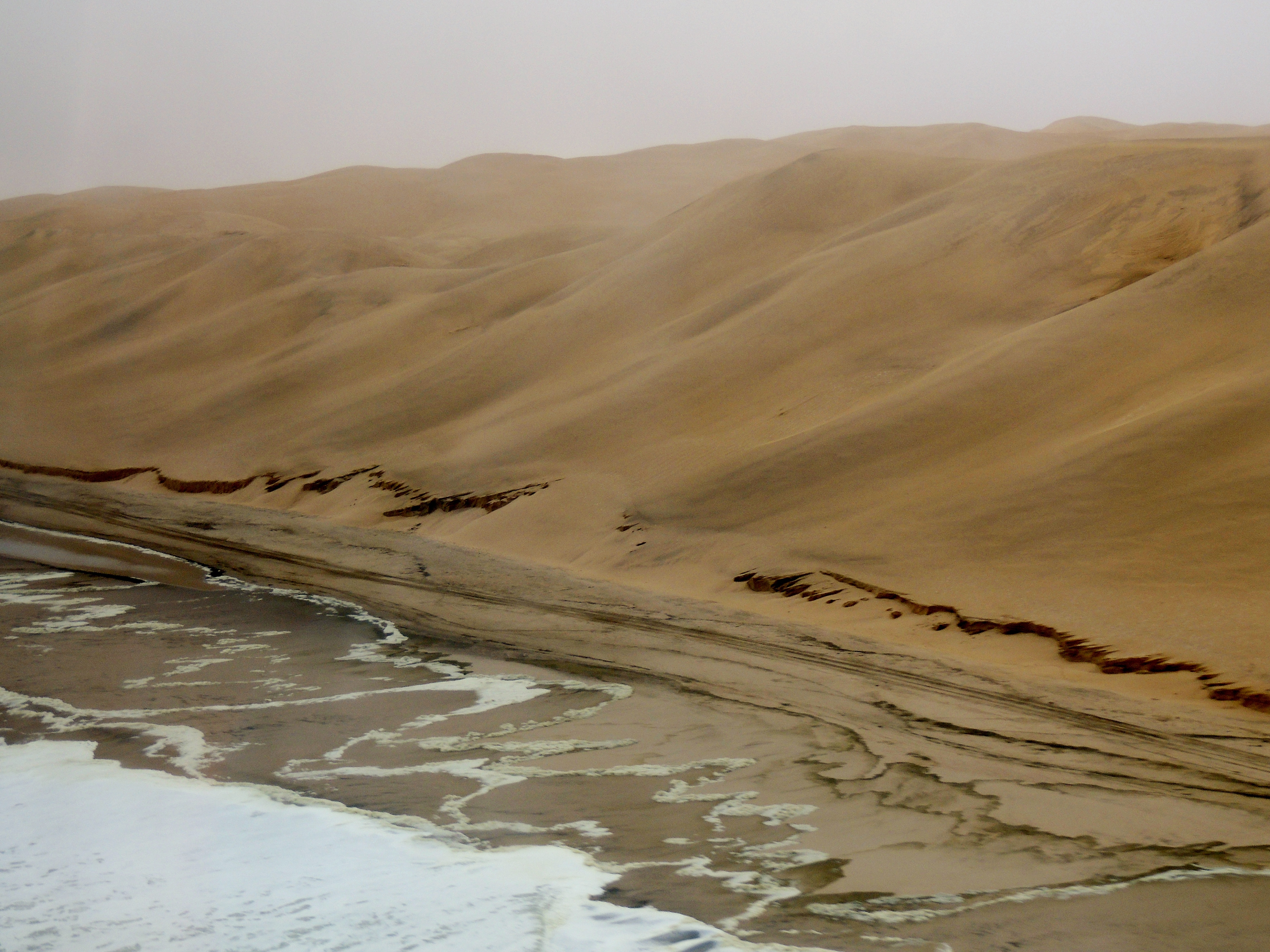
Namib desert and ocean

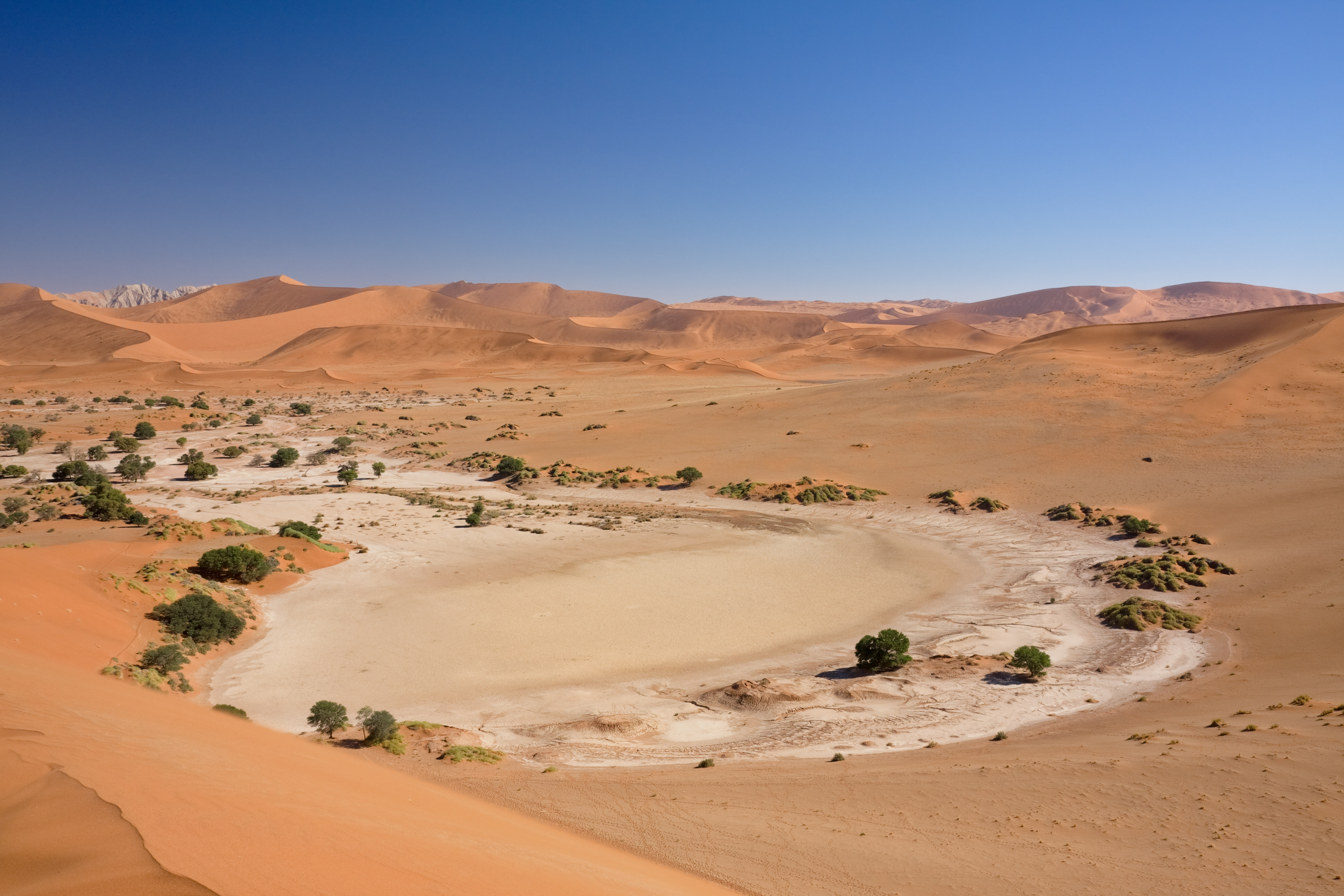
Sossusvlei, one of Namib's major tourist attractions, is a salt and clay pan surrounded by large dunes. The flats pictured here were caused by the Tsauchab stream after summer rains

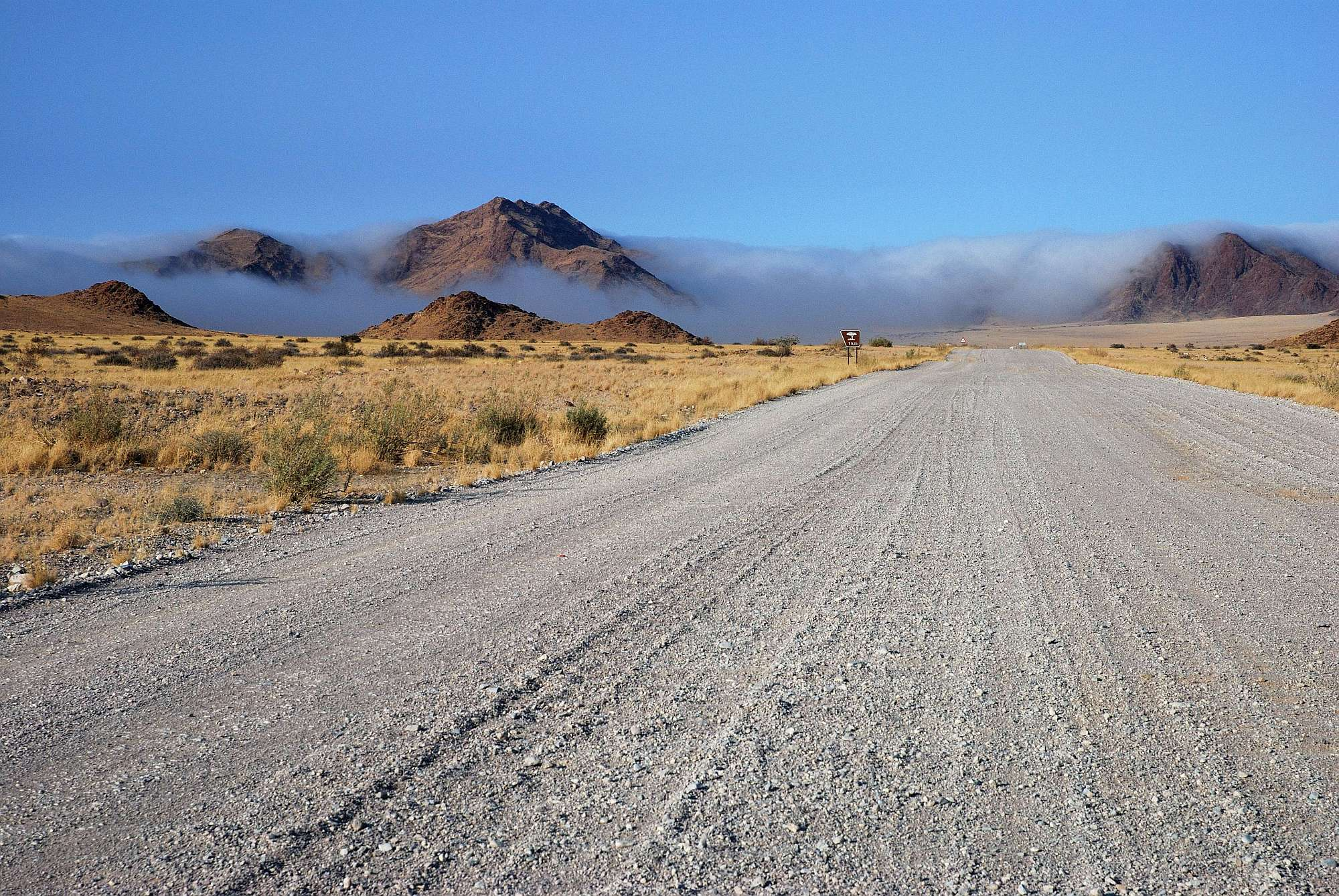
Thick morning fog rolls in from the ocean, near Sossusvlei; moisture from the fog allows the native flora to survive the aridity

The Namib Desert is one of the 500 distinct physiographic provinces of the South African Platform physiographic division. It occupies an area of around 80,950 square kilometres (31,250 sq mi), stretching from the Uniab River (north) to the town of Lüderitz (south) and from the Atlantic Ocean (west) to the Namib Escarpment (east). It is about 1,600 km (1,000 mi) long from north to south and its east–west width varies from 50 to 160 kilometres (30 to 100 miles). To the north, the desert leads into the Kaokoveld; the dividing line between these two regions is roughly at the latitude of the city of Walvis Bay, and it consists in a narrow strip of land (about 50 km wide) that is the driest place in Southern Africa. To the south, the Namib borders the South African Karoo semi-desert.

Southern Namib (between Lüderitz and the Kuiseb River) comprises a vast dune sea with some of the tallest and most spectacular dunes in the world, ranging in color from pink to vivid orange. In the Sossusvlei area, several dunes exceed 300 meters (1,000 feet) in height. The complexity and regularity of dune patterns in its dune sea have attracted the attention of geologists for decades, but it remains poorly understood.

The source of the unconsolidated sand (the most recent sand sea) is dominantly from the Orange River, which drains into the Atlantic south of the Namib Sand Sea, with minor contributions in the east from the (now ephemeral) rivers that drain into the sand sea. For this reason, the Namib Sand Sea has been referred to as the "wind displaced delta of the Orange River."

Moving north from Sossusvlei, the sand gradually gives way to a rocky desert that extends from Sossusvlei to the Swakop river. This area is traversed by the Tropic of Capricorn and is mostly flat, although some scenic canyons and elevations are found in some areas, for example in the Moon Valley system. While most of the soil is rocky, sand dunes are still occasionally found in this region; for example, sand dunes occupy much of the coastline between Walvis Bay and Swakopmund.

The Namib desert is an important location for the mining of tungsten, salt, and diamonds.

Several rivers and streams run through the Namib, although all of the rivers south of the Cunene River and north of the Orange River are ephemeral and rarely or never reach the ocean. These rivers arise in the interior mountains of Namibia and flow after summer rain storms.

== Climate ==
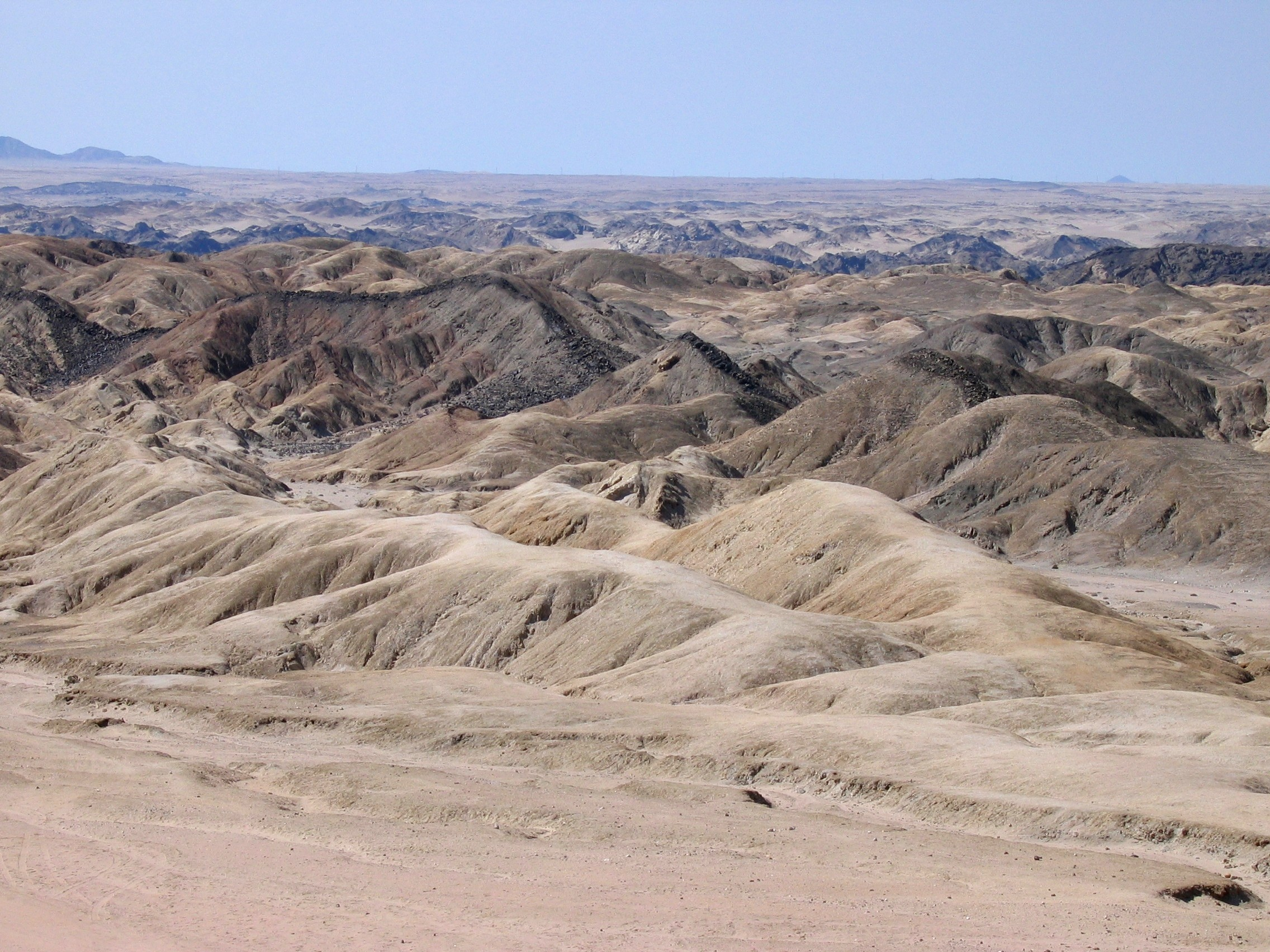
An area known as the "Moon Landscape"

The Namib's aridity is caused by the descent of dry air of the Hadley cell, cooled by the cold Benguela Current along the coast. It has less than 10 mm (0.39 in) of rain annually and is almost completely barren. Besides rain being scarce, it is also unpredictable. Western Namib gets less rain (5 mm) than eastern Namib (85 mm). This is due to several factors. Winds coming from the Indian Ocean lose part of their humidity when passing the Drakensberg mountains, and are essentially dry when they reach the Namib Escarpment at the eastern end of the desert. On the other hand, winds coming from the Atlantic Ocean are pressed down by hot air from the east; their humidity thus forms clouds and fog. Morning fogs coming from the ocean and pushing inwards into the desert are a regular phenomenon along the coast, and much of the life cycle of animals and plants in the Namib relies on these fogs as the main source of water.

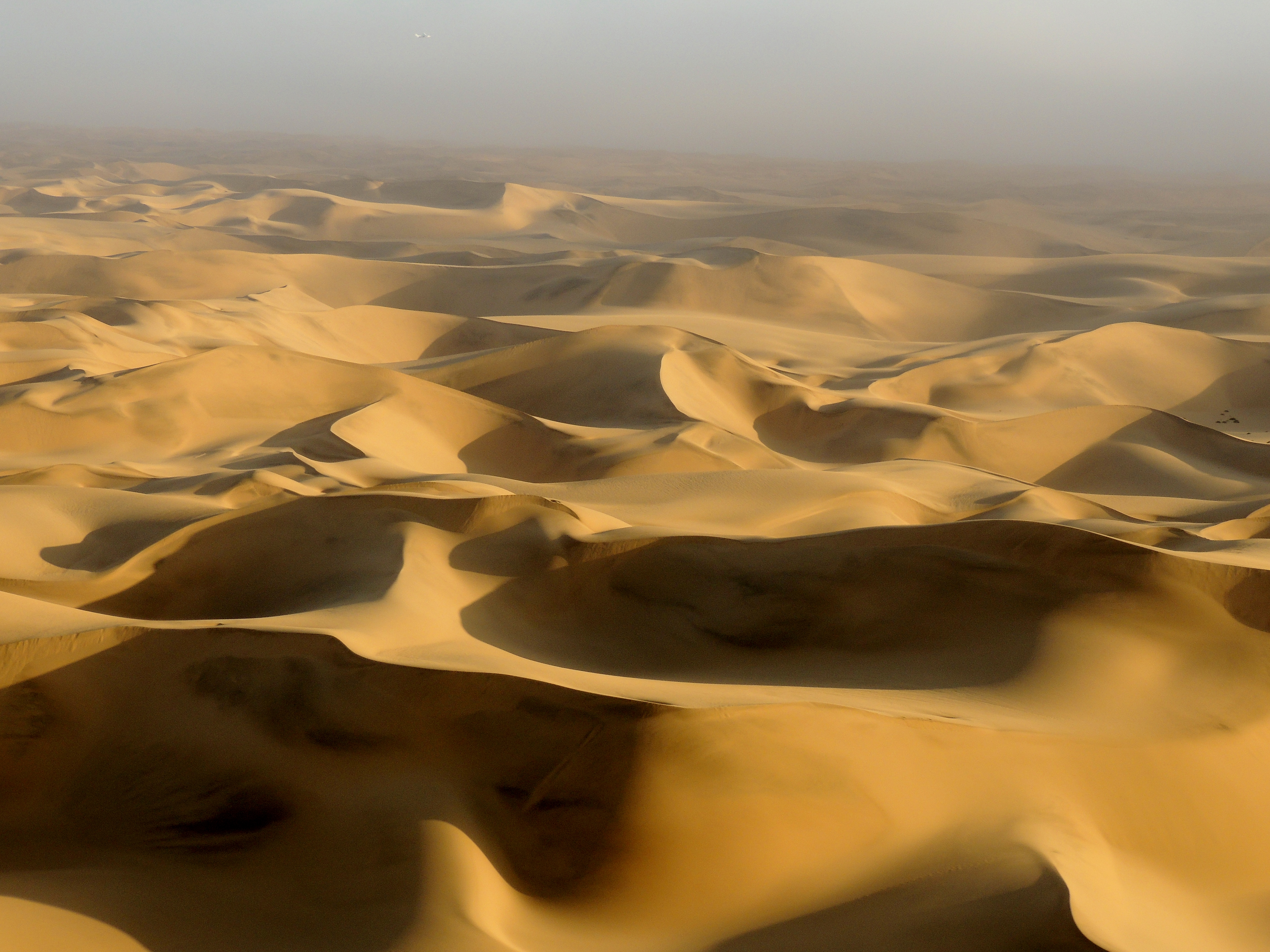
Yellow desert

The dry climate of Namib reflects the almost complete lack of bodies of water on the surface. Most rivers flow underground and/or are dry for most of the year. Even when they are not, they usually drain into endorheic basins, without reaching the sea. The Swakop and the Omaruru are the only rivers that occasionally drain into the ocean.

Namib sand sea

All along the coast, but mostly in the northernmost part of it, the interaction between the water-laden air coming from the sea via southerly winds, some of the strongest of any coastal desert, and the dry air of the desert causes immense fogs and strong currents. It causes sailors to lose their way; this is testified by the remnants of several shipwrecks that can be found along the Skeleton Coast, in northern Namib. Some of these wrecked ships (such as that of the Eduard Bolen) can be found as much as 400m inland, as the desert slowly moves westwards into the sea, reclaiming land over many years. Benguela's El Niño (similar to the Pacific event in its environmental change in the seas) spreads from the Kunene estuary southward to, on occasion, south of Luderitz. Warm waters with depth and associated water flow from the northwest were first fully catalogued by Sea Fisheries researchers in Cape Town (L V Shannon et al.). The research noted the positive effect of Benguela's El Niño on the rainfall of the interior. Rainfall records also show positive values variously across the Namib, Desert Research Station, and Gobabeb for instance. This event recurs approximately mid-decade (recent examples are 1974, 1986, 1994, 1995, and 2006).

== Plants and animals ==
=== Flora ===
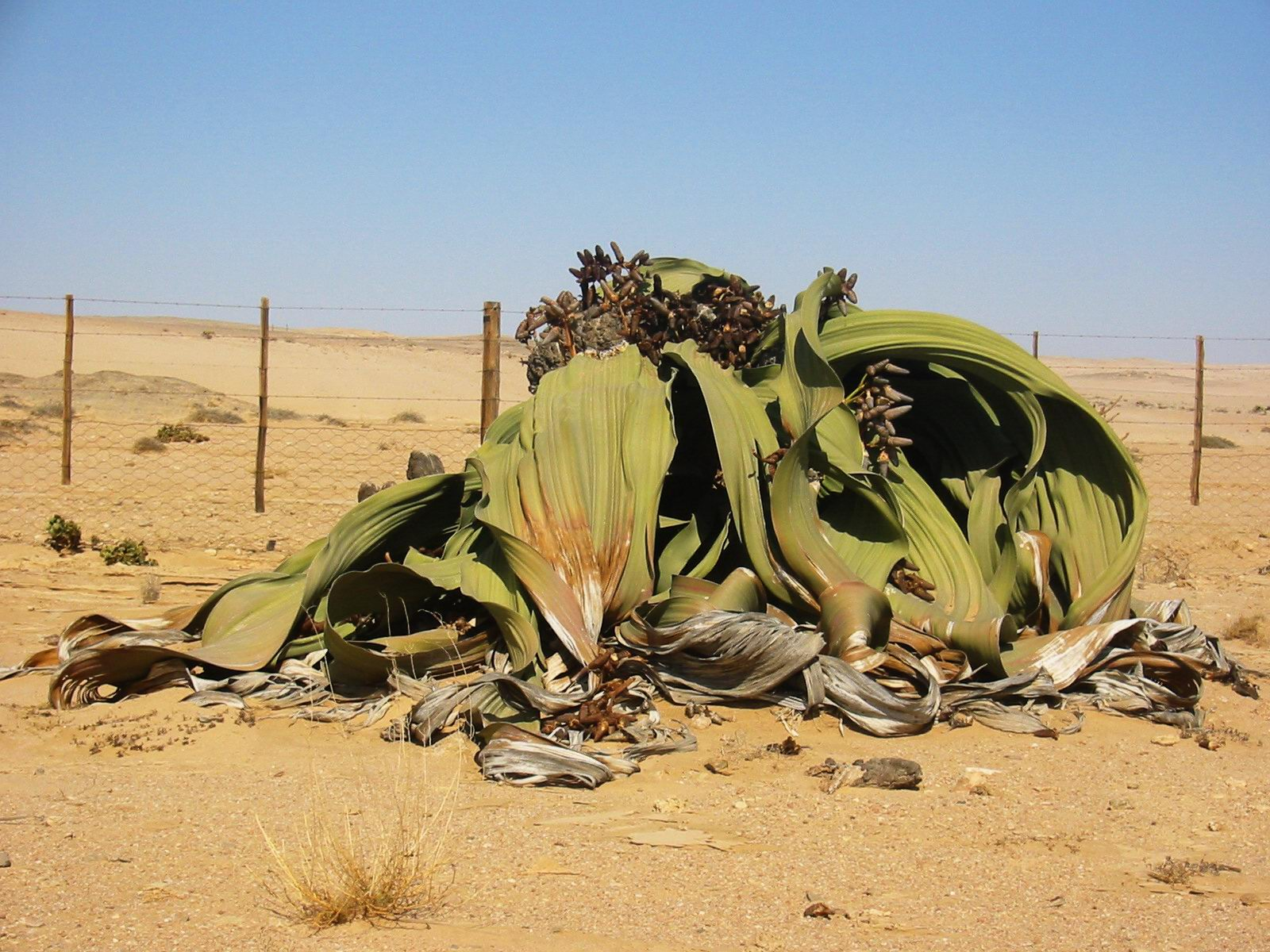
The Welwitschia plant is considered a living fossil, and is found only in the Namib desert

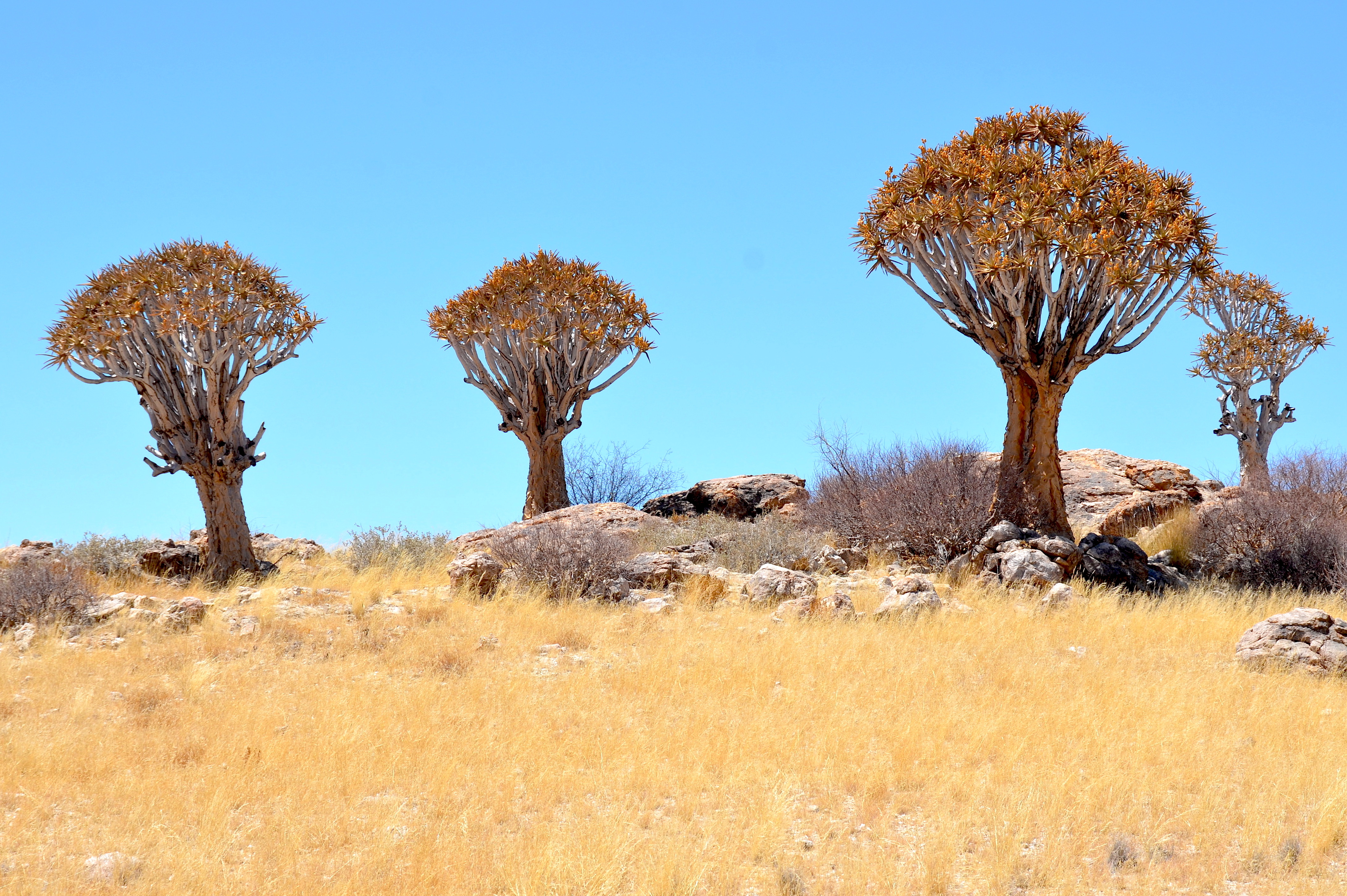
Quiver trees found within Namib desert

Several unusual species of plants and animals are found in this desert, many of which are endemic and highly adapted to the specific climate of the area.

One of the most well-known endemic plants of the Namib is the welwitchia plant, a shrub-like plant that grows two long strap-shaped leaves continuously throughout its lifetime. These leaves may be several meters long, gnarled, and twisted from the desert winds. The taproot of the plant develops into a flat, concave disc in age. Welwitschia is notable for its survival in the extremely arid Namib conditions, made possible by its ability to capture moisture from coastal sea fogs. Areas where Welwitschias are a common sight include the eponymous Welwitschia Plains, which are adjacent to the Husab uranium mine, one of the largest of its kind in the world.

"Fairy circles", which are circular patches of land barren of plants, varying between 2 and 12 metres (7 and 39 ft) in diameter and often encircled by a ring of stimulated growth of grass, are found in the Namib, such as those near the Wolwedans desert camp.

=== Fauna ===
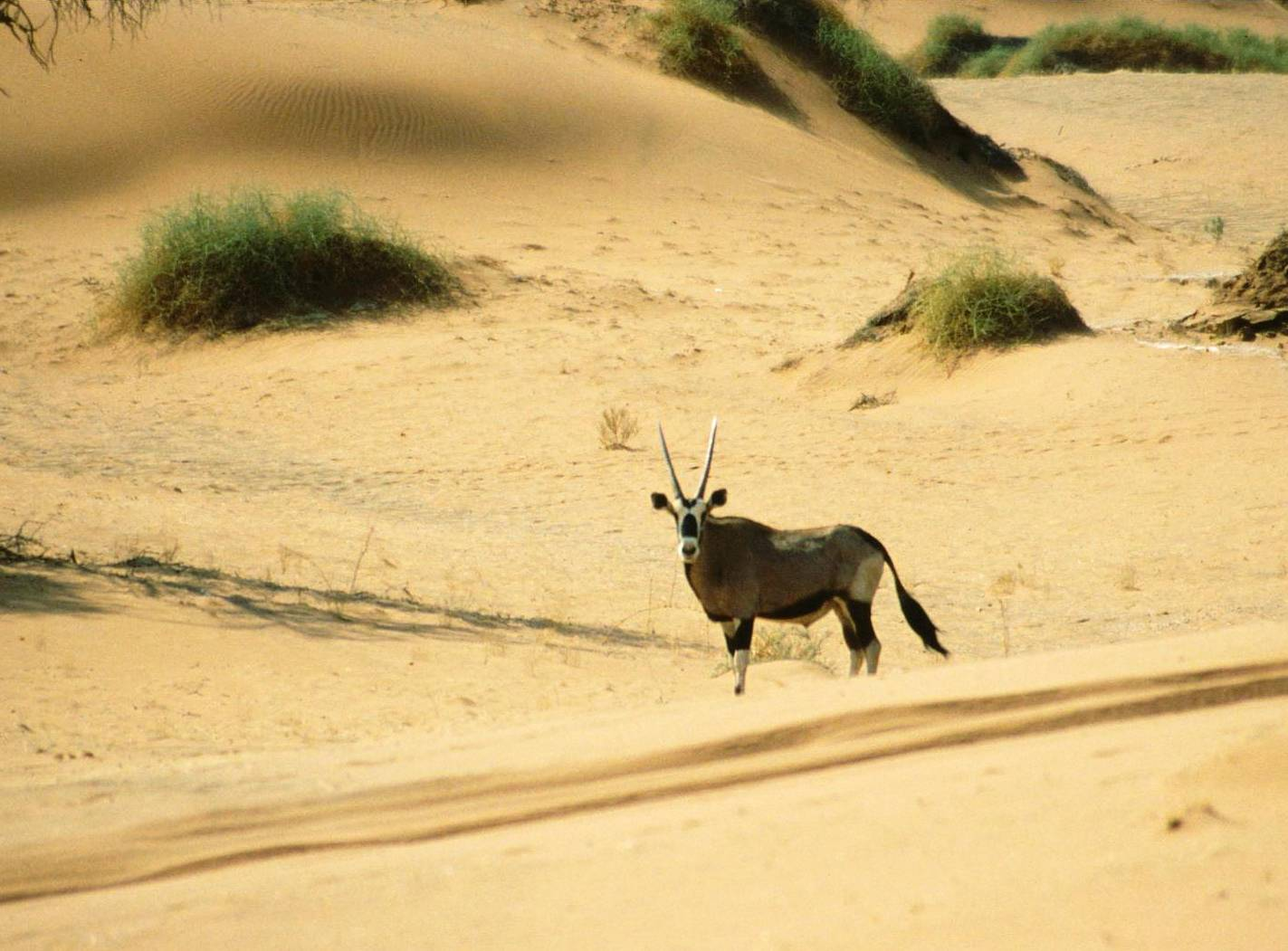
Gemsboks (Oryx gazella) are the biggest antelopes found in the Namib desert

The Namib fauna mostly comprises arthropods and other small animals that can live on little water, but a few species of bigger animals are also found, including antelopes (such as gemsboks and springboks), common ostriches, and in some areas even desert elephants or lions. All these species have developed techniques to survive in the Namib environment. Several endemic darkling beetles species have different methods of collecting water droplets from morning fog; they are collectively known as "fog beetles". For example, one beetle, Onymacris unguicularis, has smooth elytrons that cause humidity from the morning fogs to condense into droplets, which roll down the beetle's back to its mouth. Another beetle, the Lepidochora discoidalis, builds "water-capturing" webs. Black-backed jackals lick humidity from stones. Gemsboks (also known as the South African oryx) can raise the temperature of their bodies to 40 °C in the hottest hours of the day. The desert is also home to meerkats and several species of lizards.

== Human activity ==
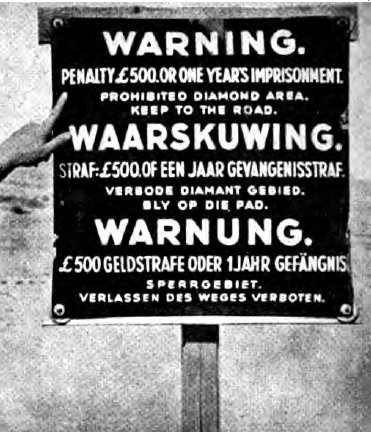
A warning sign in the Sperrgebiet from the government of South West Africa, 1947

Before the 20th century, some San roamed the Namib, gathering edible plants on the shore, hunting in the interior, and drinking the juice of the tsamma melon for water. Today, some Herero still herd their livestock in the Kaokoveld in the Namib and take them from waterhole to waterhole. A few Nama Khoikhoi still graze their livestock on the banks of the Kuiseb River in the desert. Most of the native people have left, leaving the vast majority of the desert uninhabited.

The steppes in the southern half of the desert are mostly made up of ranches run by Europeans, who raise Karakul sheep with local help and send the pelts of the lambs to Europe for use in fur coats. Most of the rest of the desert is set aside for conservation. A vast portion of the desert, called the Sperrgebiet, was access-restricted due to the presence of diamonds, which are mined in the area at the mouth of the Orange River. Although the desert is largely unpopulated and inaccessible, there are year-round settlements at Sesriem, close to the Sossusvlei area, and other small outposts in other locations. Moçâmedes in Angola, and Lüderitz, Walvis Bay, and Swakopmund in Namibia, bordering on the desert, are the main settlements in the area.

The 2015 film Mad Max: Fury Road was filmed here.

In 2019 the Namibian-German artist Max Siedentopf created an installation in the Namib consisting of a ring of large white blocks atop of which sit six speakers attached to a solar-powered MP3 player configured to continuously play the 1982 song "Africa" by the American band Toto. The exact location of the installation has not been disclosed.

Since 2021, a livestream has operated from an artificial watering hole on the inland edge of the desert.

== Namib-Naukluft National Park ==
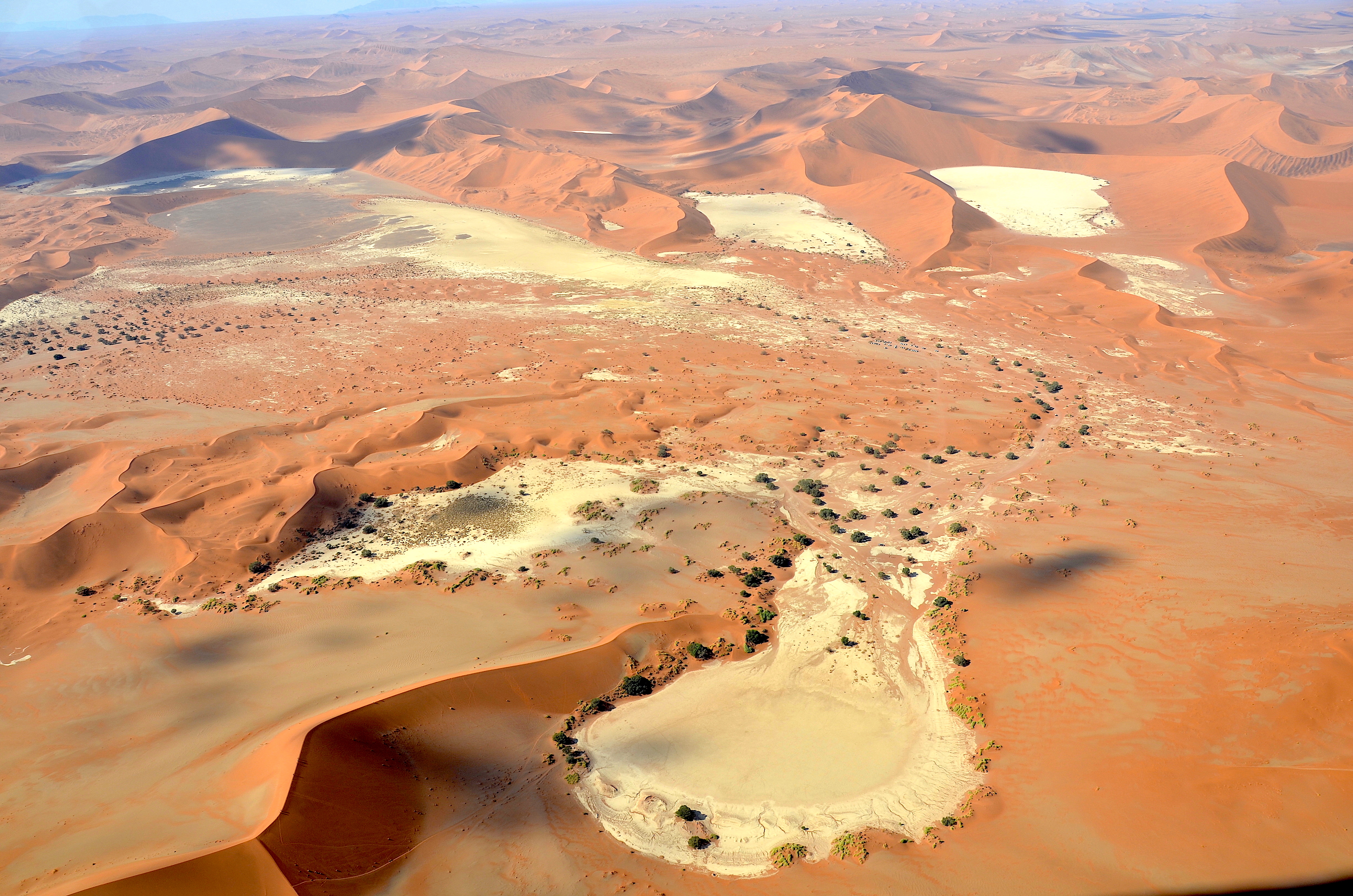
Sossusvlei Area with Deadvlei

The Sentinel-2 satellite captures a large portion of the Namib-Naukluft National Park. The Naukluft Mountains are to the east with the Sossusvlei in the centre.

The Namib-Naukluft National Park, which extends over a large part of the Namib Desert, is the largest game reserve in Africa and one of the largest in the world at 49,768 sq km (19,215 sq mi). While most of the park is hardly accessible, several well-known visitor attractions are found in the desert. The prominent attraction is the Sossusvlei area, where high orange sand dunes surround vivid white salt pans, creating a fascinating landscape.

Access to the park is either by gravel roads or dust roads (except for 60 km of concrete road from the Sesriem gate to Sossusvlei) or by light aircraft from Windhoek (the capital of Namibia, about 480 km or 300 mi northeast of the centre of the desert), or Swakopmund and Walvis Bay at the north end of the desert.

== Notable places ==
- Bogenfels
- Sesriem
- Skeleton Coast
- Solitaire
- Sossusvlei
  - Deadvlei
  - Dune 45
- Spitzkoppe
- Swakopmund

== See also ==
- Animals Are Beautiful People, a nature documentary set in the Namib
- List of deserts by area
