= Goageb =

Goageb Konkiep
- Settlement
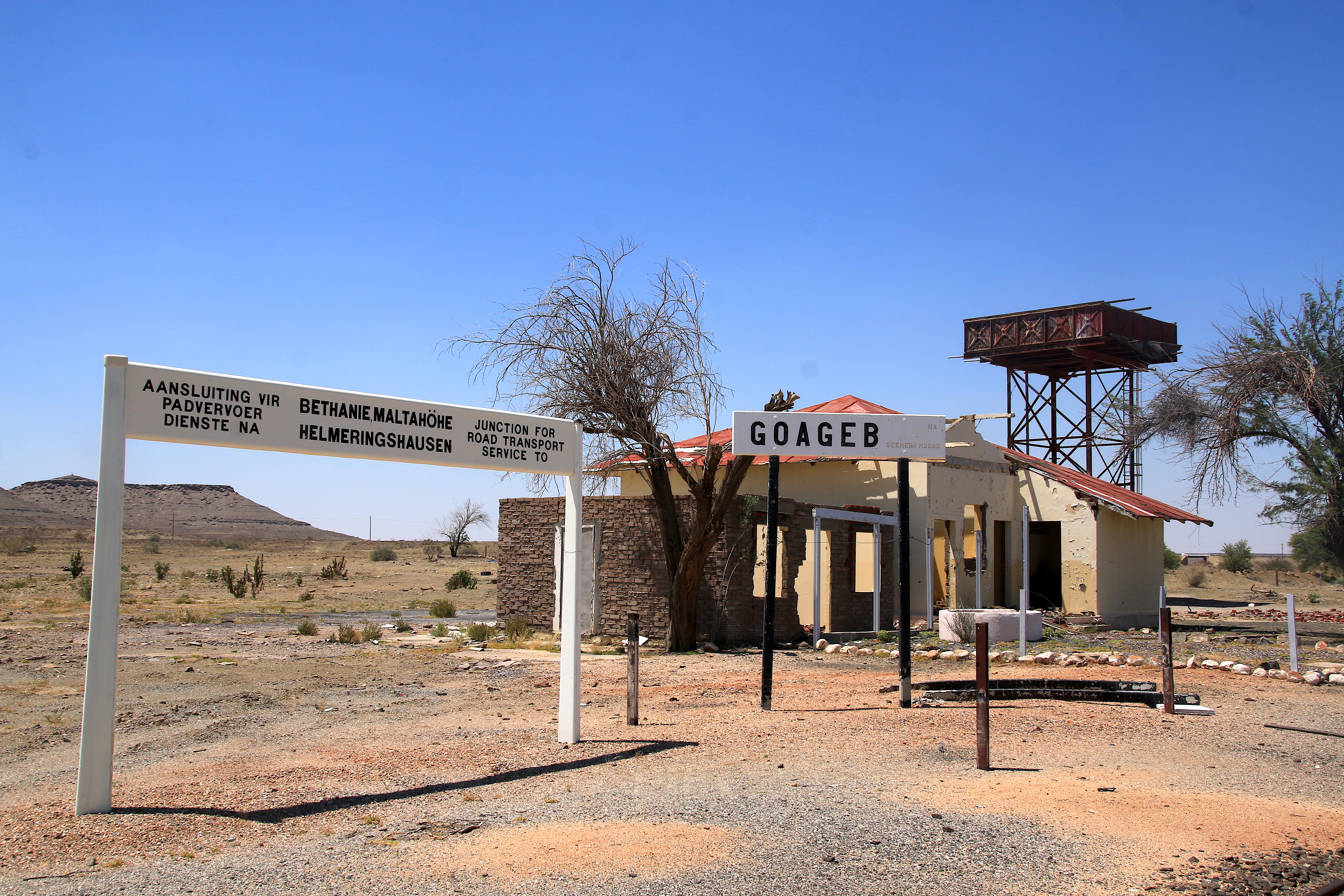
- Train station Goageb (2018)

- Location within Namibia
- Coordinates: 26.754°S 17.227°E
- Country: Namibia
- Region: ǁKaras
- Constituency: Berseba
- Time zone: UTC+2 (South African Standard Time)

Goageb is a former settlement in the ǁKaras Region of southern Namibia. It is situated on the B4, 31 kilometres (19 mi) south of Bethanie, 69 kilometres (43 mi) west of Seeheim and 249 kilometres (155 mi) east of Lüderitz. Of Nama origin, the name means "twin rivers". Formerly known as Konkiep, an adaptation of the same name, it takes its name from the Konkiep River, a tributary of the Fish River.
