= Sesriem =

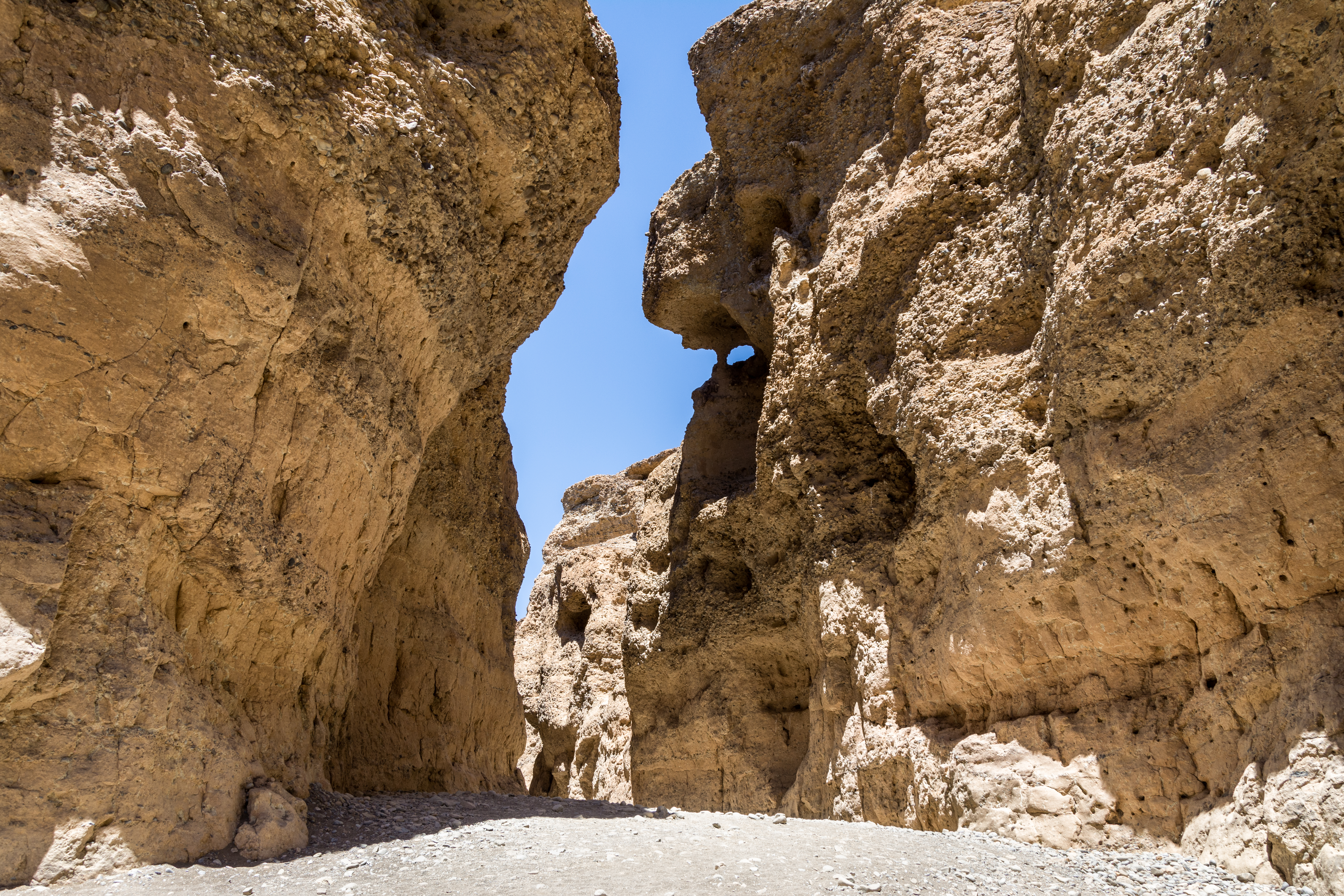
- Sesriem Canyon

- Location within Namibia
- Coordinates: 24°31′07″S 15°6′00″E
- Country: Namibia
- Region: Hardap Region
- Time zone: UTC+2 (South African Standard Time)

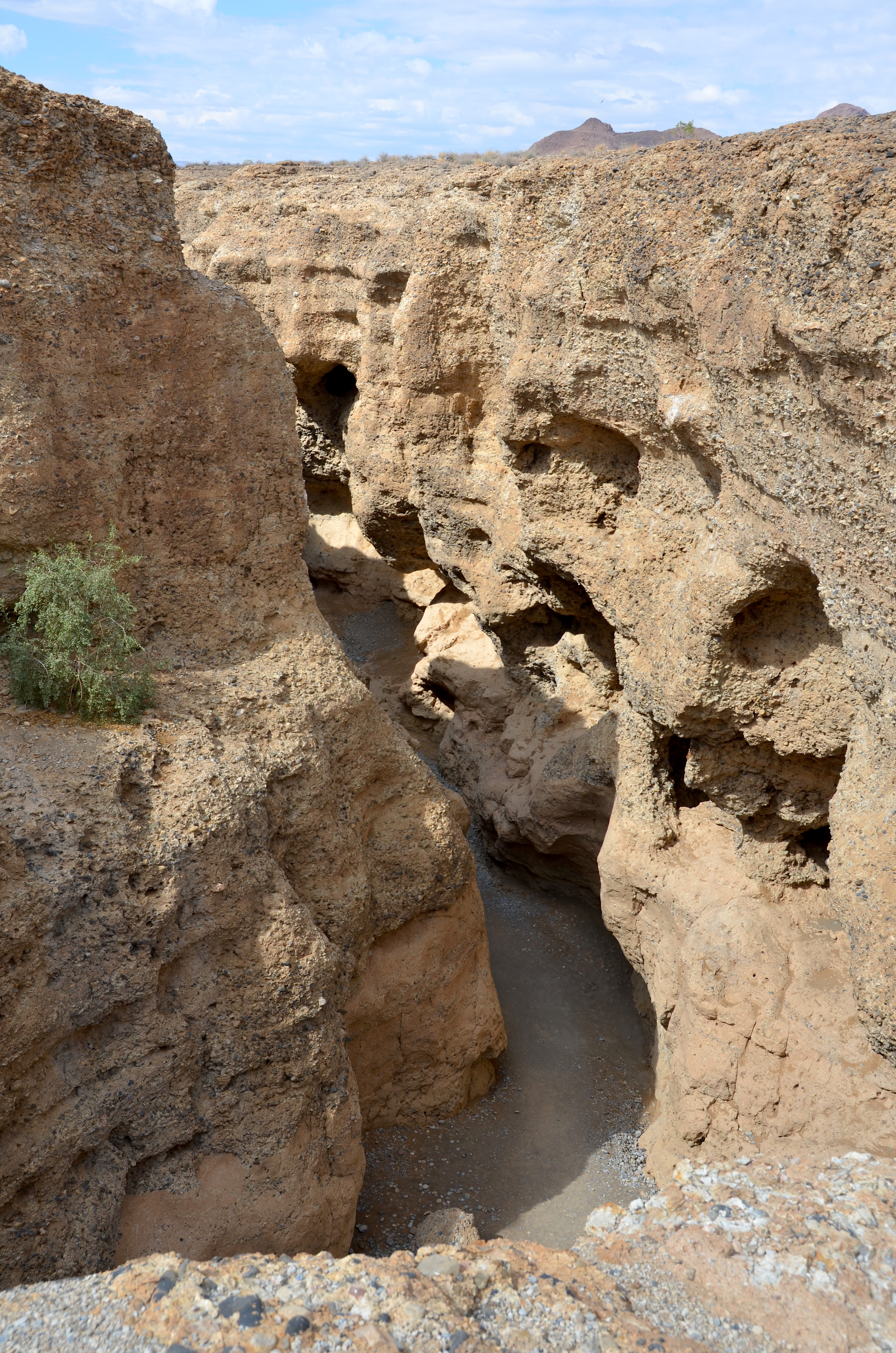
Sesriem Canyon seen from above (2017)

Sesriem is a small settlement in the Namib Desert, in the Hardap Region of Namibia, close to the southern end of the Naukluft Mountains. It is especially known because the "Sesriem gate" is the main access point to the Namib-Naukluft National Park for visitors entering the park to visit the nearby tourist attraction of Sossusvlei. As many "settlements" in the Namib, Sesriem is essentially a filling station with basic services such as public telephones and a couple of small kiosks where travellers can get general supplies such as food and water. In the surroundings of Sesriem there are several accommodation establishments, such as a few lodges (e.g., "Le Mirage Desert" and the "Sossusvlei Lodge") and 24 campsites.

At the Sesriem gate, hot air balloons depart in the early morning, providing scenic flights over the Sossusvlei dunes.

== Sesriem Canyon ==
Sesriem is also known for the Sesriem Canyon, about 4 km from Sesriem itself, which is the second most important tourist attraction in the area after Sossusvlei. It is a natural canyon carved by the Tsauchab river in the local sedimentary rock, about one kilometre (5/8 mi) long and up to 30 metres (100 ft) deep. The name Sesriem is Afrikaans and means "six rawhide thongs", given by settlers on the Dorsland Trek who had to join six such thongs in order for a bucket to reach the water. Sesriem Canyon is only two metres (6.5 feet) wide in some places, and has a portion that permanently contains water, where many animals go to drink.

== Resources ==
- More information and photos of Sesriem Canyon
