= Namibia–South Africa border =

International border

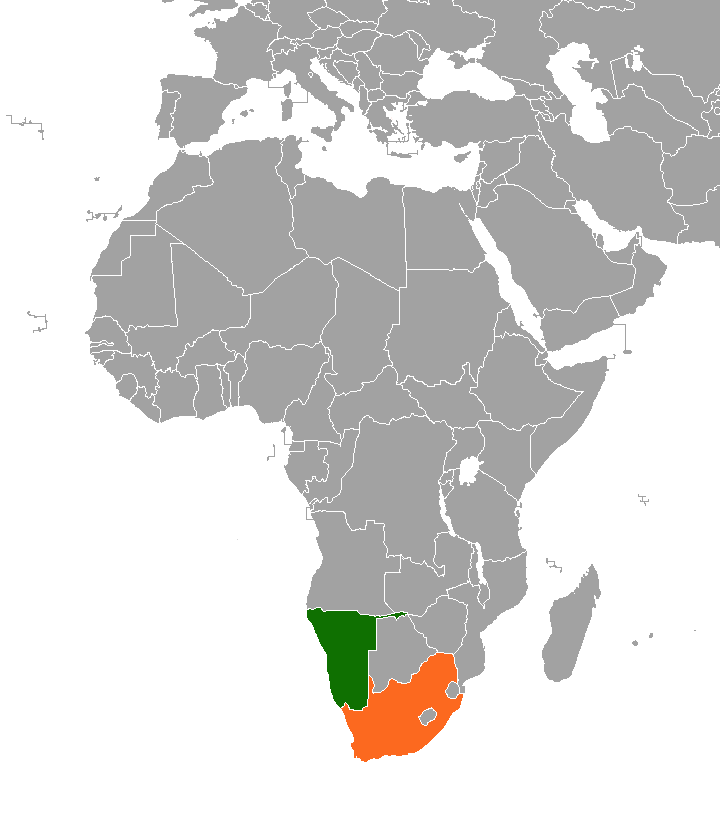
Namibia (green) and South Africa (orange)

The border between Namibia and South Africa is 967 kilometres (601 mi) long. It runs along the Orange River from its mouth on the Atlantic Ocean to the 20th meridian east, and then northwards along that meridian to the tripoint with Botswana at the Nossob River.

== History ==
European settlement at the Cape began with the Dutch East India company in 1652, and was taken over by Britain at the start of the 19th century. In 1847, the boundaries of the Cape Colony were expanded as far as the Orange River. In 1878 Walvis Bay, the only natural harbour on the coast of what is now Namibia, was annexed as an exclave of the Cape Colony. German settlement in Namibia, meanwhile, began in 1883 with the founding of Lüderitz. The colony of German South-West Africa was formally established in 1884.

The Heligoland–Zanzibar Treaty of 1890 delimited the boundaries between German and British spheres of influence in Africa. The German sphere in southwest Africa was defined in Article III, the relevant part of which reads as follows.

In Southwest Africa, Germany's sphere of influence is demarcated thus:

1. To the south by the line that commences at the mouth of the Orange River and continues up its northern bank to its intersection point with the 20th degree of east longitude.

2. To the east by the line that commences at the aforementioned point and follows the 20th degree of east longitude to its intersection point with the 22nd degree of south latitude. [...]

During the First World War German Southwest Africa was conquered by South African forces, and after the war South Africa was granted a League of Nations mandate to administer the territory. The border between South Africa proper and the Territory of South West Africa remained the same as the former colonial border, and when Namibia finally achieved independence in 1990 it became once again an international border. The South African exclave at Walvis Bay was transferred to Namibia in 1994.

== Dispute ==
The Namibia–South Africa border dispute centers on the precise demarcation along the Orange River, which forms the southern boundary of Namibia. Historically, the 1890 Helgoland-Zanzibar Treaty between Britain and Germany set the boundary along the northern bank of the river. However, Namibia argues that, based on international principles and its own 1990 constitution, the boundary should run along the river’s median line, not at the high-water mark of the northern bank. South Africa maintains the colonial-era boundary definition, leading to ongoing discussions but no formal resolution.

The dispute is complicated by strategic and economic concerns, as the Orange River region is rich in natural resources, particularly diamonds and valuable alluvial minerals. This area also faces water allocation challenges, especially as climate change impacts water levels and availability. Both countries have participated in joint commissions, like the Orange-Senqu River Commission, to manage transboundary water concerns, yet the boundary disagreement persists due to the lack of a legally binding accord that addresses the specific claims from each side.

Further details on this issue, including insights from recent bi-national commission meetings, can be found.

== Crossings ==
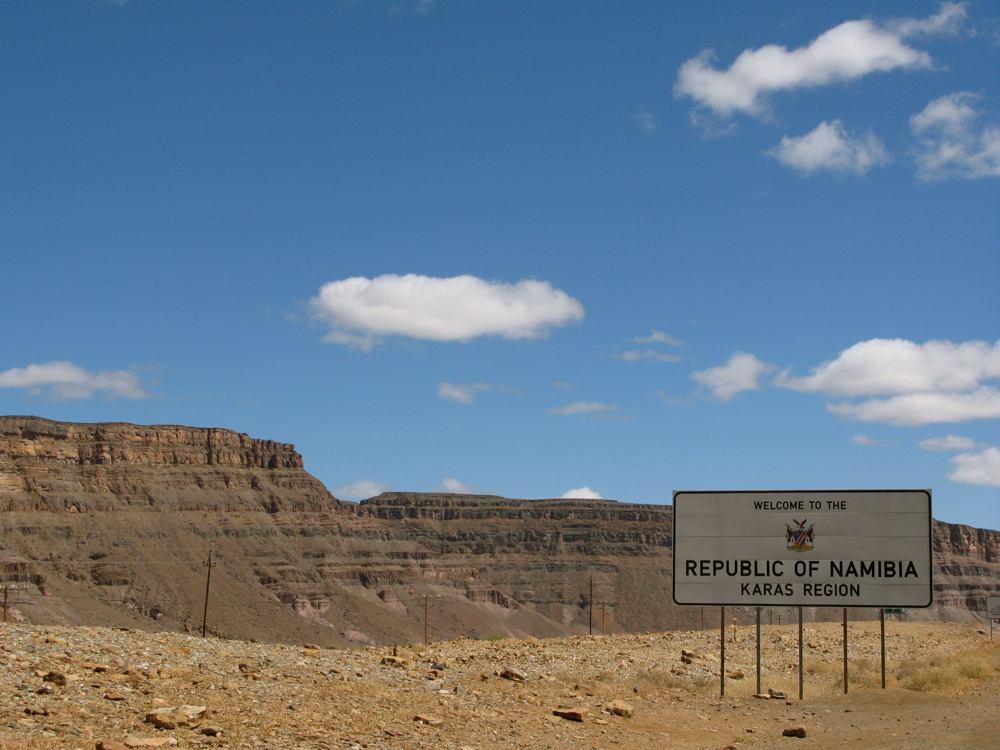
The Namibian side of the border at Noordoewer

There are seven official border crossings, of which two are located in transfrontier parks and are dedicated for use by park visitors. The principal crossings are at Noordoewer/Vioolsdrif for traffic from Namibia to Cape Town, and at Ariamsvlei/Nakop for traffic from Namibia to Gauteng and eastern South Africa.

Namibia		South Africa		Opening hours	Notes	Geographical coordinates
Road	Border post	Road	Border post	Opening hours	Notes	Geographical coordinates
	Oranjemund		Alexander Bay	6:00–22:00	Permit required for the Sperrgebiet.	28.5647°S 16.5036°E
	Sendelingsdrif		Sendelingsdrif	8:00–16:30	Pontoon ferry in the Ai-Ais/Richtersveld Transfrontier Park; tourist use only.	28.1227°S 16.8889°E
B1	Noordoewer	N7	Vioolsdrif	24 hours		28.7656°S 17.6262°E
C10	Velloorsdrift	R358	Onseepkans	8:00–16:30		28.7345°S 19.3056°E
B3	Ariamsvlei	N10	Nakop	24 hours	Windhoek–De Aar railway also crosses here.	28.0949°S 19.9992°E
C16	Klein Menasse	R31	Rietfontein	8:00–16:30		26.7564°S 19.9992°E
C15	Welverdiend	R360	Mata Mata	8:00–16:30	Crossing in the Kgalagadi Transfrontier Park; tourist use only.	25.7679°S 20.0000°E

== See also ==
- Cape of Good Hope
- Walvis Bay
- Namibia–South Africa relations
- White South Africans
- Western Cape
- Netherlands–South Africa relations
- South Africa–United Kingdom relations
- German Namibians
- Germany–Namibia relations
