= C10 road (Namibia) =

Secondary route in Namibia

C10 road

Major junctions
- South-east end: R358 at the South African border at Onseepkans
- To B3 near Karasburg; B1 near Grünau; C37 near ǀAi-ǀAis
- North-west end: ǀAi-ǀAis

Location
- Country: Namibia

Highway system
- Transport in Namibia
| ← B15 | → C11 |

C10 is an untarred highway in southern Namibia. It starts in ǀAi-ǀAis and ends at the Namibia–South Africa border where the road changes into the R358 road at Onseepkans. The highway is 241 kilometres (150 mi) long. The road travels one kilometre (0.62 mi) past from Karasburg, which can be accessed by the M21. This also can be used to get onto the B3 road.
