= Speed limits in South Africa =

Overview of the speed limits on roads in South Africa

Speed limits in South Africa are set the same in each province of South Africa. Highway speed limits can range from an urban low of 60 km/h to a rural high of 120 km/h. Speed limits are typically posted in increments of 20 km/h. There are also limits for trucks and occasionally minimum speed limits. The general speed limits are regulated in terms of the National Road Traffic Act, 1989.

Commonly used road speed limit signs in South Africa

== Speed limits ==
=== General terms ===
- 60 km/h on a public road within an urban area
- 100 km/h on public road outside an urban area which is not a freeway; and
- 120 km/h on most freeways.

=== National routes ===
National routes in South Africa numbered from N1 to N18 have a fixed speed limit of 120 km/h, with sections which are in urban areas limited to 100 km/h.

==== Special regulation ====
On a section of the N14 between Pofadder and Kakamas, authorised vehicles for speed testing are subject to 250 km/h speed limit on a 160-km-long section of road.

=== Provincial and regional routes ===
Regional and provincial routes in South Africa numbered from R100 to R799 have a speed limit ranging from 60 km/h to 100 km/h, with some parts limited to 120 km/h.

=== Metropolitan routes ===
Metropolitan routes in South Africa numbered "Mxy" have a speed limit ranging from 60 km/h to 100 km/h, with some parts at 120 km/h

== Proposed reduction ==
It has been proposed that the national speed limit throughout South Africa should be reduced. This would be implemented with South Africa's new road demerit system.

The Department of Transport proposed that the baseline top speeds across the country's roads should be reduced by 20 km/h. This would effectively drop the speed limit on the country's highways from 120 km/h to 100 km/h, while the top speeds on main roads would drop from 100 km/h to 80 km/h. Speeds in residential areas would decrease from 60 km/h to 40 km/h.

== See also ==
- Numbered routes in South Africa
