= N10 (South Africa) =

National road in South Africa

Coordinates: 28.412691°S 21.186361°E

National route N10

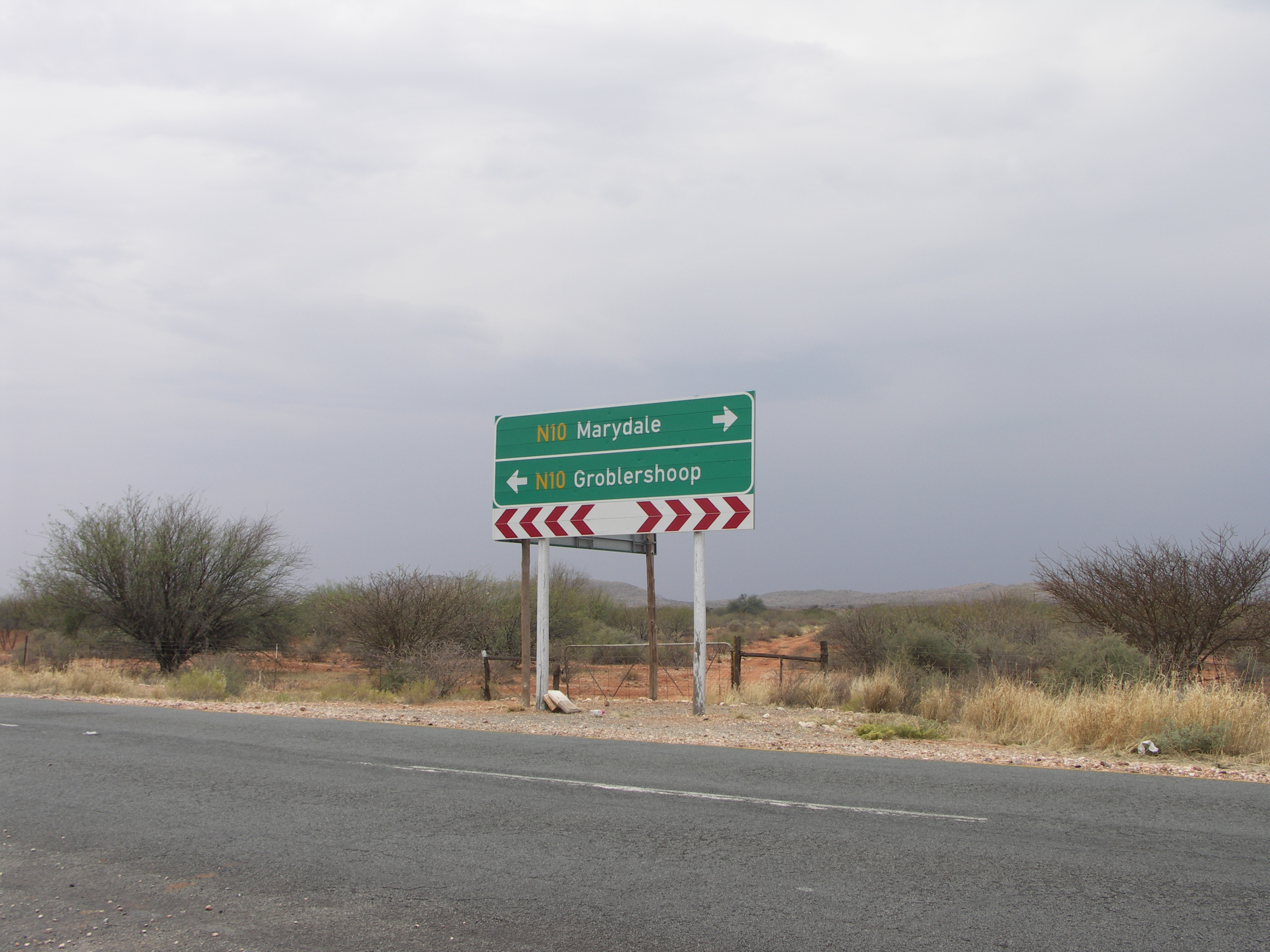
- The N10 in the Northern Cape

Route information
- Maintained by SANRAL
- Length: 1,000 km (620 mi)

Major junctions
- Northwest end: B3 at the Namibian border at Nakop
- N14 in Upington; N8 at Groblershoop; N12 at Britstown; N1 at Hanover; N9 near Middelburg
- Southeast end: N2 near Colchester

Location
- Country: South Africa
- Provinces: Northern Cape, Eastern Cape
- Major cities: Upington; Prieska; De Aar; Middelburg; Nxuba

Highway system
- Numbered routes of South Africa
← N9	→ N11

The N10 is a national route in South Africa connecting Gqeberha on the Eastern Cape coast with the Namibian border at Nakop, via Nxuba, De Aar and Upington.

== Route ==
Detailed Route

=== Northern Cape ===
The N10 begins at Nakop in the Northern Cape, on the border with Namibia. On the Namibian side, the road is known as the B3 and the border settlement is known as Ariamsvlei. It begins by running east for 130 km to the city of Upington. After its intersection with the R360 (which provides a shorter route south into Upington Central), the N10 continues eastwards up to the Upington Airport entrance (a t-junction), where it turns south and enters the Upington City Centre. At the Brug Street junction, the N10 meets the N14 and they are concurrent on Brug Street south-eastwards. At the junction with Scott Street, the N14 turns eastwards while the N10 turns southwards to cross the Orange River.

From Upington, the N10 follows the Orange River for 114 km east-south-east, through Grootdrink, to the town of Groblershoop, where it meets the western end of the N8 national route from Kimberley. From the N8 junction, the N10 continues following the Orange River south-east for 133 km, through Marydale, to the town of Prieska.

From Prieska, the N10 continues south-east for 126 km to Britstown, where it meets the N12. The N10 and N12 routes are one road southwards for 3 km before the N10 becomes its own road south-east just north of the Britstown city centre. The N10 proceeds eastwards for 43 km to bypass the town of De Aar, where it meets the southern terminus of the R48. From De Aar, the N10 continues south-east for 59 km to reach the town of Hanover, where it meets the N1. The N10 continues east-south-east for 62 km to enter the Eastern Cape.

=== Eastern Cape ===
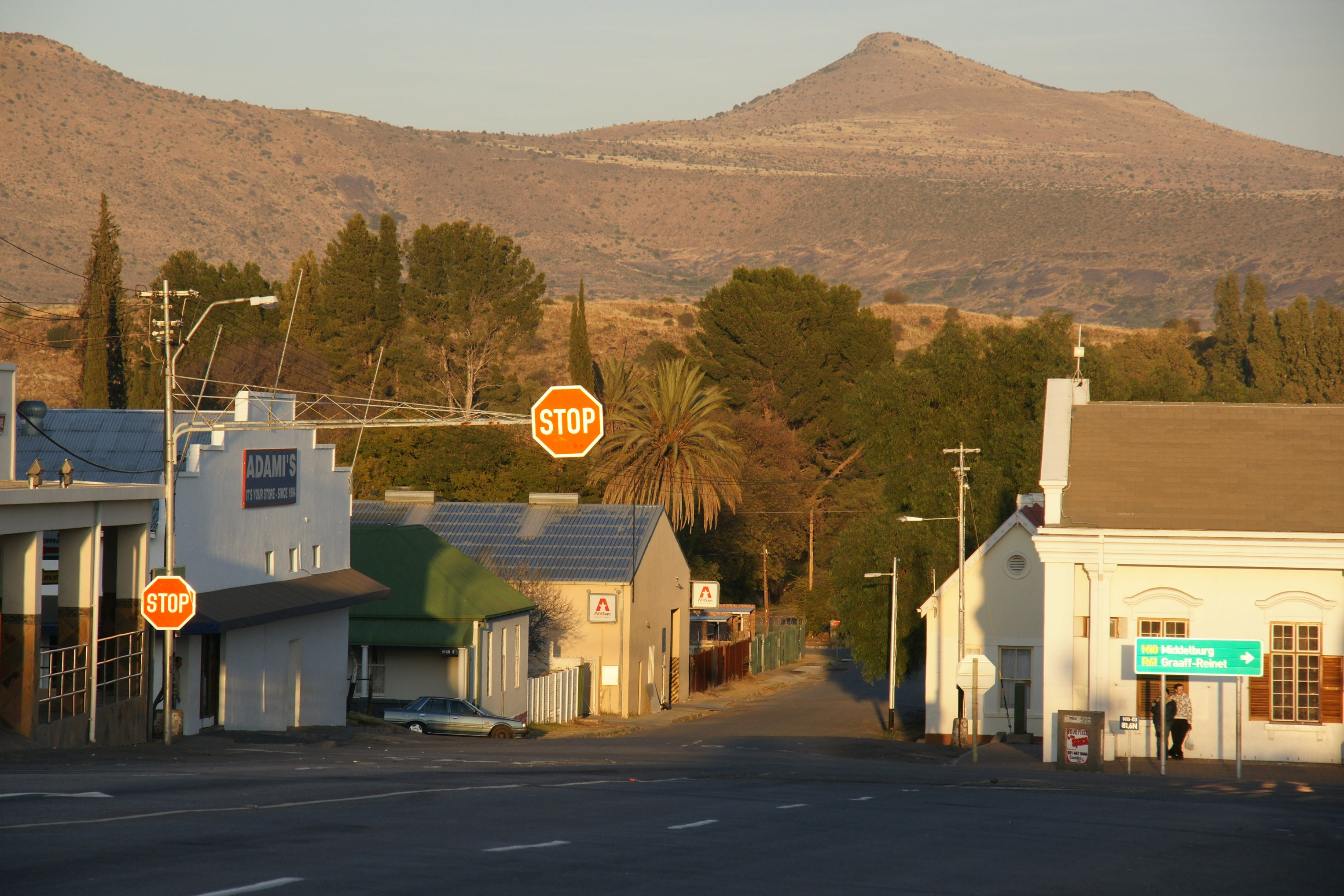
A junction in Nxuba (formerly Cradock)

The N10 meets the N9 south of Noupoort. The N10 and N9 are one road southwards for 24 kilometres into the town of Middelburg (bypassing the town centre to the east) before splitting south of the town centre. The N10 continues south-east for 95 kilometres, crossing the Great Fish River and following it, to the town of Nxuba, where it meets the R61. The R61 and the N10 enter the town as one road, crossing the Great Fish River again, turning south as J.A. Calata Street, then east as Commissioner Street, then south-east as Hospital Street, before splitting north of the Lingelihle township. From Nxuba, the N10 continues southwards for 80 km as the Daggaboers Nek, still following the Great Fish River, to the town of Cookhouse. It meets the R63 and they are one road into the town, before splitting east of the town centre.

From Cookhouse, the N10 follows the Great Fish River southwards for another 24 km as the Olifantskop Pass to the town of Middleton. The N10 continues southwards for another 88 km, through Paterson, to reach its southern terminus at an intersection with the N2 and the R72 about 45 km north-east of Gqeberha (35 km north-east of Coega; 12 km north-east of Colchester).

== Junctions ==
=== Northern Cape ===
Municipality	Location	km	mi	Exit	Destinations	Notes
B3 ends at Namibia–South Africa Border; N10 begins
Kai ǃGarib	Nakop	0	0	Nakop Border Post		
Dawid Kruiper	Upington	0	0	—	R360 Swartmodder Street, Upington, Askham	At-grade intersection
Dawid Kruiper	Upington	0	0	—	N14 Nelson Mandela Drive west, Keimoes	At-grade intersection; Northern end of concurrency with N14
Dawid Kruiper	Upington	0	0	—	N14 Alfred Qayiso Gubula Street east, Olifantshoek	At-grade intersection; Southern end of concurrency with N14
Dawid Kruiper	Upington	0	0	—	R359, Louisvale	At-grade intersection
ǃKheis	Groblershoop	0	0	—	N8, Griekwastad, Kimberley	At-grade intersection
Siyathemba	Marydale	0	0	—	R383, Marydale, Griekwastad	At-grade intersection
Siyathemba	Prieska	0	0	—	R357, Prieska, Copperton	Quadrant interchange
Emthanjeni	Britstown	0	0	—	N12 north, Strydenburg, Hopetown	At-grade intersection; Northern end of concurrency with N12
Emthanjeni	Britstown	0	0	—	N12 Mark Street south, Britstown, Victoria West	At-grade intersection; Southern end of concurrency with N12
Emthanjeni	De Aar	0	0	—	R48, De Aar, Philipstown	At-grade intersection
Emthanjeni	De Aar	0	0	—	R388 Main Road, De Aar, Richmond	
Emthanjeni	Hanover	0	0	—	N1, Colesberg, Beaufort West	Quadrant interchange
N10 continues into the Eastern Cape

=== Eastern Cape ===
Municipality	Location	km	mi	Exit	Destinations	Notes
Inxuba Yethemba	Middelburg	0	0	—	N9 north, Noupoort, Colesberg	At-grade intersection; Northern end of concurrency with N9
Inxuba Yethemba	Middelburg	0	0	—	R56, Middelburg, Steynsburg	Quadrant interchange
Inxuba Yethemba	Middelburg	0	0	—	N9 south, Graaff-Reinet, George	Quadrant interchange with ramps; Southern end of concurrency with N9
Inxuba Yethemba	Middelburg	0	0	—	R401, Hofmeyr, Nieu-Bethesda	At-grade intersection
Inxuba Yethemba	Nxuba	0	0	—	R61 west, Graaff-Reinet	At-grade intersection; Northern end of concurrency with R61
Inxuba Yethemba	Nxuba	0	0	—	R390 J.A. Calata Street, Hofmeyr	At-grade intersection
Inxuba Yethemba	Nxuba	0	0	—	R337 Church Street, Pearston	At-grade intersection
Inxuba Yethemba	Nxuba	0	0	—	R61 east, Queenstown	At-grade intersection; Southern end of concurrency with R61
Blue Crane Route	Cookhouse	0	0	—	R63 east, Bedford	At-grade intersection; Northern end of concurrency with R63
Blue Crane Route	Cookhouse	0	0	—	R63 Somerset Road west, Cookhouse, Somerset East	At-grade intersection; Southern end of concurrency with R63
Blue Crane Route	Kommadagga	0	0	—	R400, Riebeek East, Jansenville	At-grade intersection
Sundays River Valley	Paterson	0	0	—	R342 Pullen Street, Paterson, Addo	At-grade intersection
Sundays River Valley	Colchester	0	0	—	R72, Port Alfred, N2, Gqeberha, Makhanda	At-grade intersection with R72; Ramp access to N2 at exit 798
Sundays River Valley	Colchester	0	0	(797)	N2 west, Gqeberha	
N10 ends
