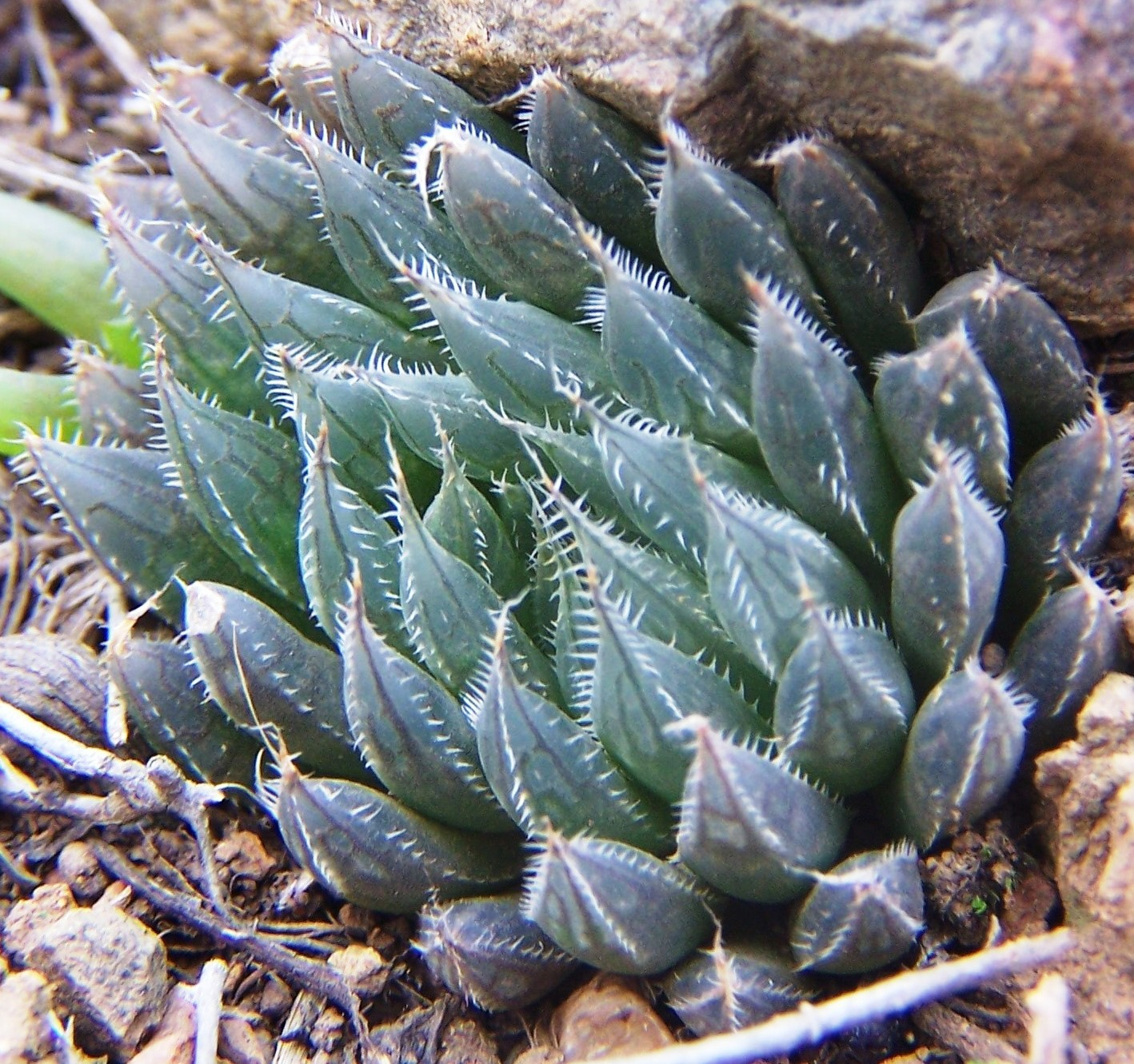

Scientific classification
- Kingdom: Plantae
- Clade: Tracheophytes
- Clade: Angiosperms
- Clade: Monocots
- Order: Asparagales
- Family: Asphodelaceae
- Subfamily: Asphodeloideae
- Genus: Haworthia
- Species: H. aristata

Binomial name
- Haworthia aristata Haw., (1819)

Synonyms
- Aloe denticulata (Haw.) Schult. & Schult.f.; Catevala denticulata (Haw.) Kuntze; Haworthia denticulata Haw.; Haworthia lapis Breuer & M.Hayashi; Haworthia lapis var. rava (M.Hayashi) Breuer; Haworthia rava M.Hayashi; Haworthia rava M.Hayashi; Haworthia setata var. subinermis Poelln.

= Haworthia aristata =

Species of succulent

Haworthia aristata is a perennial succulent belonging to the genus Haworthia. The species is endemic to the Eastern Cape and occurs from Port Elizabeth to Kommadagga. The plant is threatened by development, overgrazing and quarrying. The plant is excessively collected by the public for garden planting.
