= Sendelingsdrift =

Border post between Namibia and South Africa

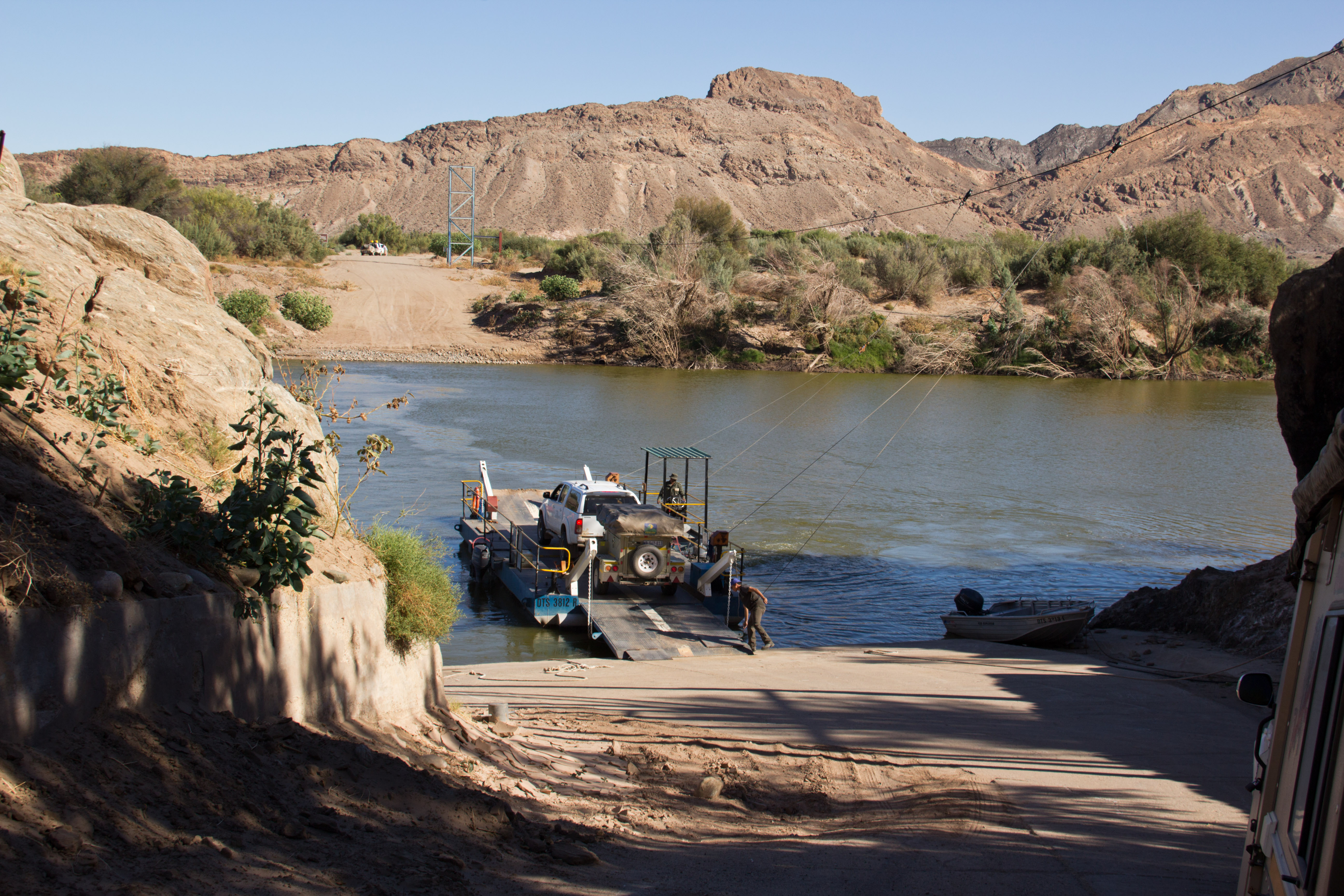
Sendelingsdrift looking towards the Namibian side of the border

Sendelingsdrift is a border post between Namibia and South Africa in the Richtersveld. The Octha cable ferry crosses the Orange River (Garib) to Namibia. It is guided by tethers on a high rope and is fitted with two outboard motors. The post is usually open from 8:00 AM to 4:00 PM. It also serves as an entrance to the ǀAi-ǀAis/Richtersveld Transfrontier Park.
