= Namibia–South Africa relations =

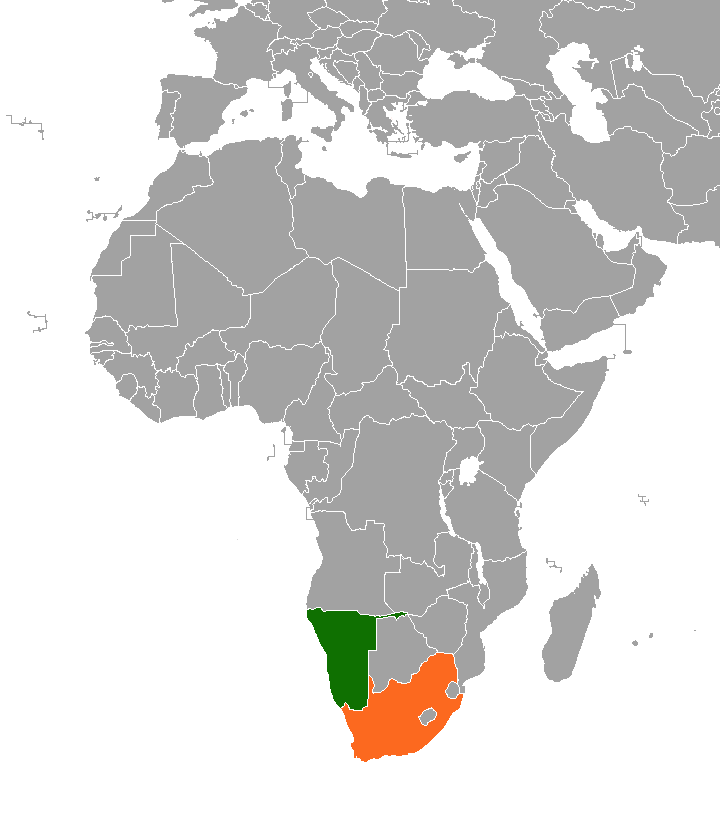
- Namibia: South Africa

Namibia–South Africa relations refers to the current and historical relationship between Namibia and South Africa. South Africa (then part of the British Empire as the Union of South Africa) captured the area now known as Namibia from Germany during World War I and governed it, by the name 'South West Africa', until 1990, when the country gained independence under the name 'Namibia'. During those 75 years, thousands of South Africans settled in the territory and South Africa treated the area as effectively a fifth province of both the Union and the Republic, imposing apartheid laws in South West Africa as it did in South Africa.

Both nations are members of the African Union, Commonwealth of Nations, Southern African Development Community and the United Nations.

== Dutch, British and German colonizations in Southern Africa (1652-1910) ==
The roots of European presence in South Africa began under the Dutch East India Company (VOC), which sailed from Amsterdam. Jan van Riebeeck established a logistical base there in 1652 on the route to the Dutch East Indies (later Indonesia), especially Batavia (Jakarta), until the British seized the Cape Colony during the French Revolutionary Wars in 1795. Britain permanently occupied the Cape from the Dutch in 1806 and formally acquired it under the London Convention of 1814. After the War of the Seventh Coalition and the Battle of Waterloo in 1815, Napoleon was exiled by the British government at the remote island of Saint Helena to prevent any further escape attempts after he arrived on 15 October 1815 and lived at Longwood House until his death on 5 May 1821 to secure peace in Europe.

When the British had secured the eastern frontier against the Xhosa tribes, the government in London sponsored thousands of British immigrants, most notably the 1820 Settlers. The British colony connected the networks of India (including Bengal) which was led by His Excellency Charles John Canning, 1st Earl Canning, along the route to Singapore and Hong Kong until 1869 with Egypt Suez Canal. These settlers were stationed in the Albany district near the Great Fish River alongside existing Boer and indigenous populations.

The British territorial ambitions in South Africa did not stop at the Eastern Cape. In 1843, Britain annexed the Colony of Natal on the eastern coast of South Africa, largely to prevent the Voortrekkers (Boers who had migrated inland during the Great Trek) from establishing an independent port. Natal quickly grew into an economic asset. By the 1860s, a booming sugarcane industry was established in the fertile coastal soils. Because the local communities of the Zulus resisted working on the plantations, this agricultural boom prompted the large-scale importation of indentured labourers from India between 1860 and 1911.

The German chancellor Otto von Bismarck declared Namibia a German protectorate in 1884 during the Scramble for Africa, named German South West Africa which was deemed suitable for large-scale white settlement, drawing thousands of German immigrants from cities like Berlin and Munich. These settlers, along with miners and merchants, renamed towns, cities, and villages with German names (such as Lüderitz, Swakopmund, and the capital, Windhoek).

Colonists and Christian missionaries established educational networks to teach indigenous Africans to speak, read, and write German, aiming to create an obedient workforce capable of navigating the German colonial administration. This era was marked by the violent displacement of local populations and the devastating Herero and Nama genocide carried out by the German forces and the Schutztruppe. Namibia was the only German colony in Africa uniquely suited for large-scale white settlement.

After the British victory in the Second Boer War, the independent Boer republics—the South African Republic (Transvaal) and the Orange Free State were dissolved and absorbed into the British Empire. Seeking to consolidate economic and political control over the region, the British government unified four distinct colonies including Transvaal and the Orange River Colony as part of the unification had formed the Union of South Africa on 31 May 1910. It was established as a self-governing British Dominion, granting the white minority political autonomy similar to the constitutional status enjoyed by Canada and Australia.

== South West Africa and Namibian independence (1915-1990) ==
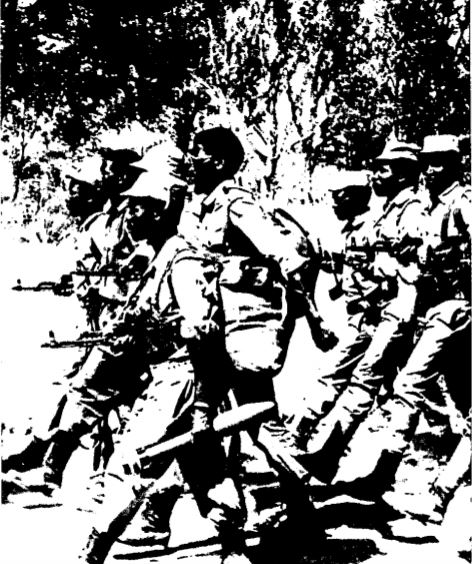
SWAPO soldiers during the South African Border War; 1984.

During World War I, South Africa captured and occupied what was then German South West Africa beginning in 1915.

After the war, the League of Nations removed overseas territories from a defeated Germany and they mandated the territory to South Africa as a trusteeship, as a 'Class C Mandate', known as South West Africa. South Africa proposed that it be allowed to annex the territory; but this proposal was rejected by the United Nations General Assembly, the successor to the League of Nations. However the South African government refused to accept the United Nations' authority. As a result, South West Africa continued to be administered directly by South African administrators in Pretoria as if it was a fifth province, and many white South African settlers came to the country. South African Apartheid was also introduced into the country and led to the creation of tribal homelands for black inhabitants of the country.

In August 1966, the South African Border War began between the South West Africa People's Organization (SWAPO) and the South African Defence Force. SWAPO's goal was to obtain independence from South African dominance. SWAPO had majority international support and received military assistance from neighboring independent nations, Angola's People's Armed Forces for the Liberation of Angola (FAPLA) and Cuba.

In January 1968, the United Nations Security Council adopted United Nations Security Council Resolution 245 which called for South Africa to end the illegal detention and trial of South West Africans, and then in March they adopted United Nations Security Council Resolution 246 censuring the South African government for failing to comply.

Then in August 1969, United Nations Security Council Resolution 269 was passed, declaring South Africa's continued occupation of Namibia illegal. In 1971, the Namibian contract workers strike occurred across the country to break the contract labor system and promote independence under SWAPO leadership. Near the end of the strike, many of the workers eventually joined PLAN, fighting in the war for independence. The war lasted until March 1990 with South-West Africa winning its independence and the country was renamed Namibia.

In 1994, South Africa ceded Walvis Bay and the Penguin Islands to Namibia. Walvis Bay was a British colony until World War I. This small enclave was never part of German South West Africa and so had not been part of the mandate territory.

== Post-Namibian independence (since 1990) ==
Flag of South West Africa (1928–1990) before independence from South Africa

Flag of Namibia (since 1990) after independence from South Africa

After Namibia gained independence from South Africa on 21 March 1990, it marked the end of 75 year administration under South African rule. In 1994, apartheid ended in South Africa and Nelson Mandela was elected President of South Africa. Since then, relations between Namibia and South Africa have remained close. There have been numerous visits between leaders of both nations and several agreements have been signed. The economy of Namibia is also closely linked to South Africa in terms of trade and South African companies have large investments in the key industries in Namibia such as mining, retail, banking and insurance. Namibia contributes greatly to the growth and development of the South African tourism industry. Namibia ranked as South Africa's 9th largest source of tourism.

In 2014, when Namibia was affected by a long drought, South Africa donated 100 million Rand to ease the impact.

Namibia is part of the Common Monetary Area, which means that the South African rand remains in circulation along with the Namibian dollar.

== Resident diplomatic missions ==
of Namibia in South Africa

- Pretoria (High Commission)
- Cape Town (Consulate-General)

of South Africa in Namibia

- Windhoek (High Commission)

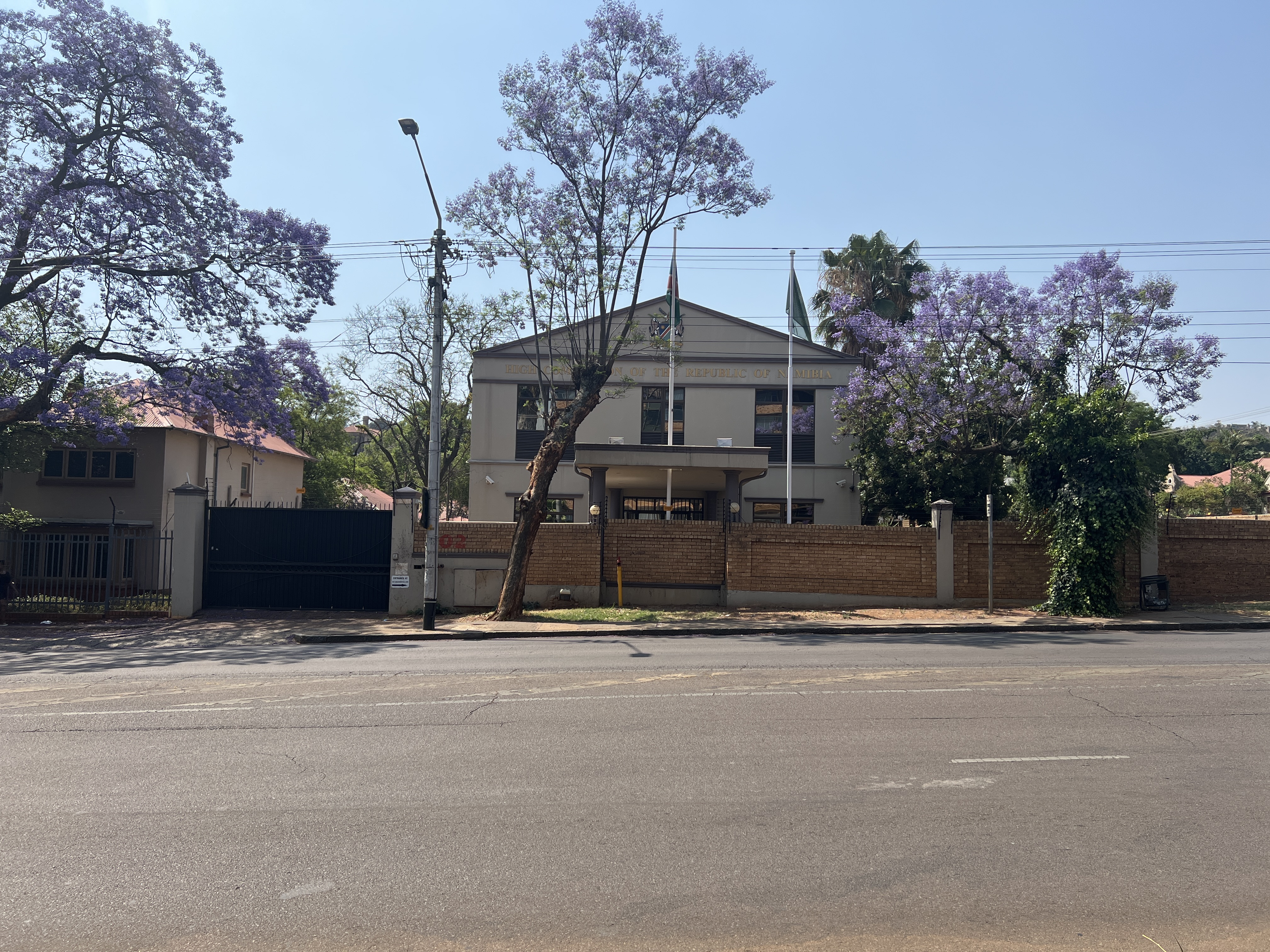
High Commission of Namibia in Pretoria

== See also ==
- Namibia–South Africa border
