= Daggaboers Nek =

Mountain pass in South Africa

Coordinates: 32°32′08.0″S 25°50′35.1″E

Daggaboers Nek Pass, also known simply as Daggaboers Nek, is situated in the Eastern Cape province of South Africa, on the N10 national route, between Cookhouse and Cradock. The tarred pass has a northern and southern approach, with double lanes on both ascents.

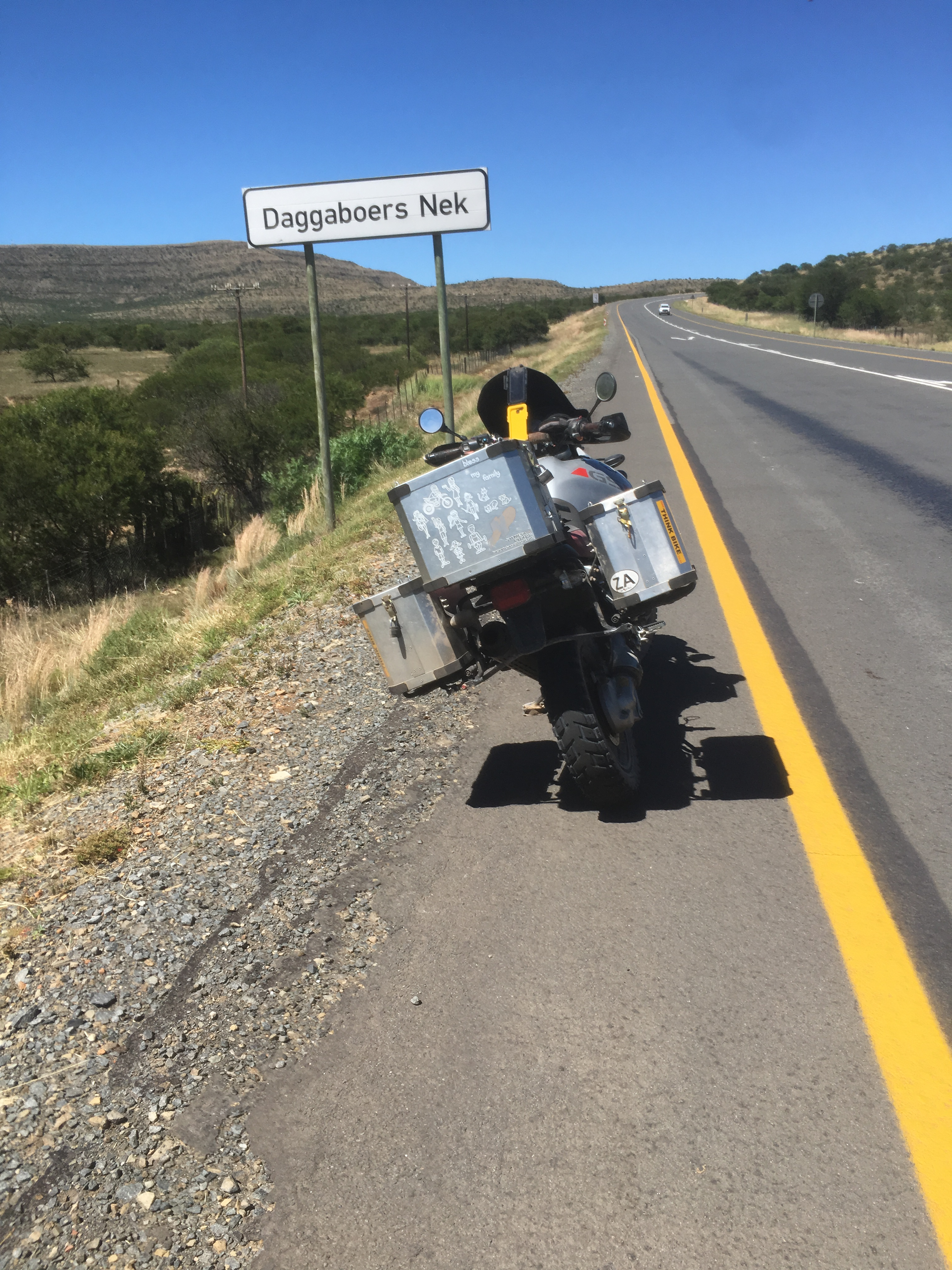

== Background ==
It was named for the farm Daggaboersnek, which up to 1752 was known as Knapzakfontein. The pass has been in regular use since the 19th century, and a blacksmith, trading post, police station and small hotel were established there. The voortrekker Louis Tregardt for a time (c.1814–1820s) farmed in its vicinity, as did Piet Retief on the northern approach to the crest. In 1837 Benjamin D'Urban determined that the boundary between districts Cradock and Somerset would run over Daggaboers Nek. The 8th Frontier war (1850–1853) took place in the general area, and on old year's eve 1851, deserters from the Cape Corps ambushed and killed two young men, Henry and Edward Trollip, at Sunnyside farm near the nek. The Trollips were British Settlers whose graves can still be seen here, the earliest dating to 1856.

The Daggaboer Farm Stall opened in November 2006 on the northern approach, some 3 km from the crest, and Daggaboer safaris on the southern approach offers overnight accommodation. SANRAL started a major upgrade of the pass in January 2013, which was expected to take 5 years.

"Dagga" is a South African word for wheat, grass or cannabis, while "boers" means farmers', and "nek" is a saddle, yet the origin of this place name is not known. It is speculated that cannabis may have been cultivated here, perhaps as a supplement to horse feed. "Dagga" was however also a Khoisan word for game, while "Daggaboer" may be a concatenation of a greeting like "dag ou boer."
