= Fish River Canyon =

Largest canyon in Africa

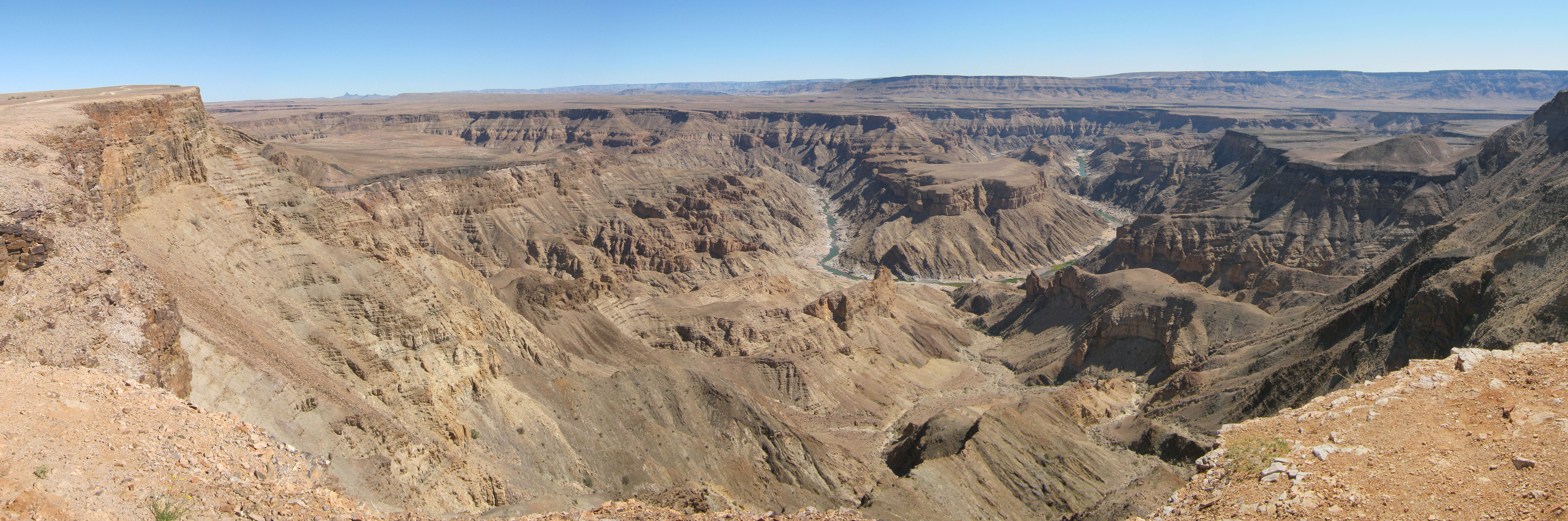
- Panorama from Main View Point

- Location within Namibia
- Coordinates: 27.589293°S 17.597587°E
- Area: 5,900 km^{2} (2,300 sq mi)
- Governing body: Ministry of Environment and Tourism

The Fish River Canyon (Afrikaans: Visrivier Canyon or Visrivier Kuil, German: Fischfluss Canyon) is located in the south of Namibia. It is the largest canyon in Africa, and the second most visited tourist attraction in Namibia. It features a gigantic ravine, in total about 160 kilometres (100 mi) long, up to 27 km wide and in places almost 550 meters deep.

The Fish River is the longest interior river in Namibia. It cuts deep into the plateau which today is dry, stony and sparsely covered with hardy drought-resistant plants. The river flows intermittently, usually flooding in late summer; the rest of the year it becomes a chain of long narrow pools. The hot springs resort of ǀAi-ǀAis is situated at the lower end of the Fish River Canyon.

Public view points can be visited near Hobas, a camp site 70 km north of ǀAi-ǀAis. This part of the canyon is part of the ǀAi-ǀAis/Richtersveld Transfrontier Park, while the remainder is privately owned.

== Geology ==
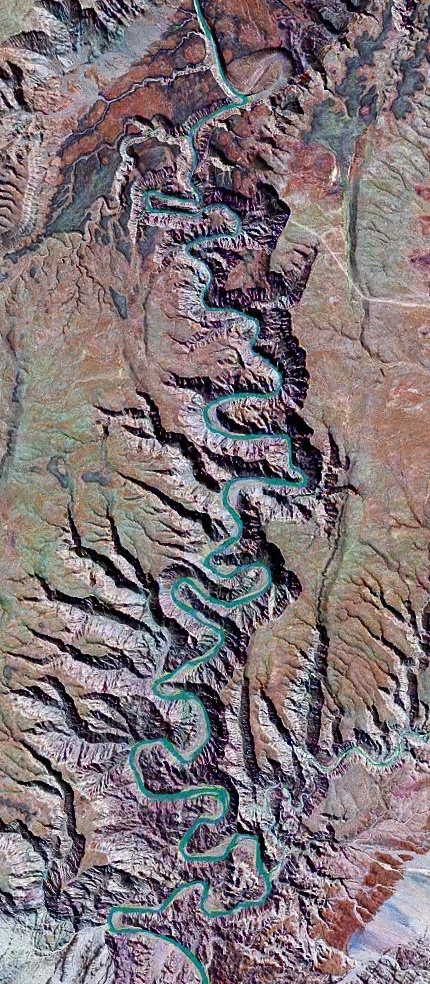
Satellite image of the canyon

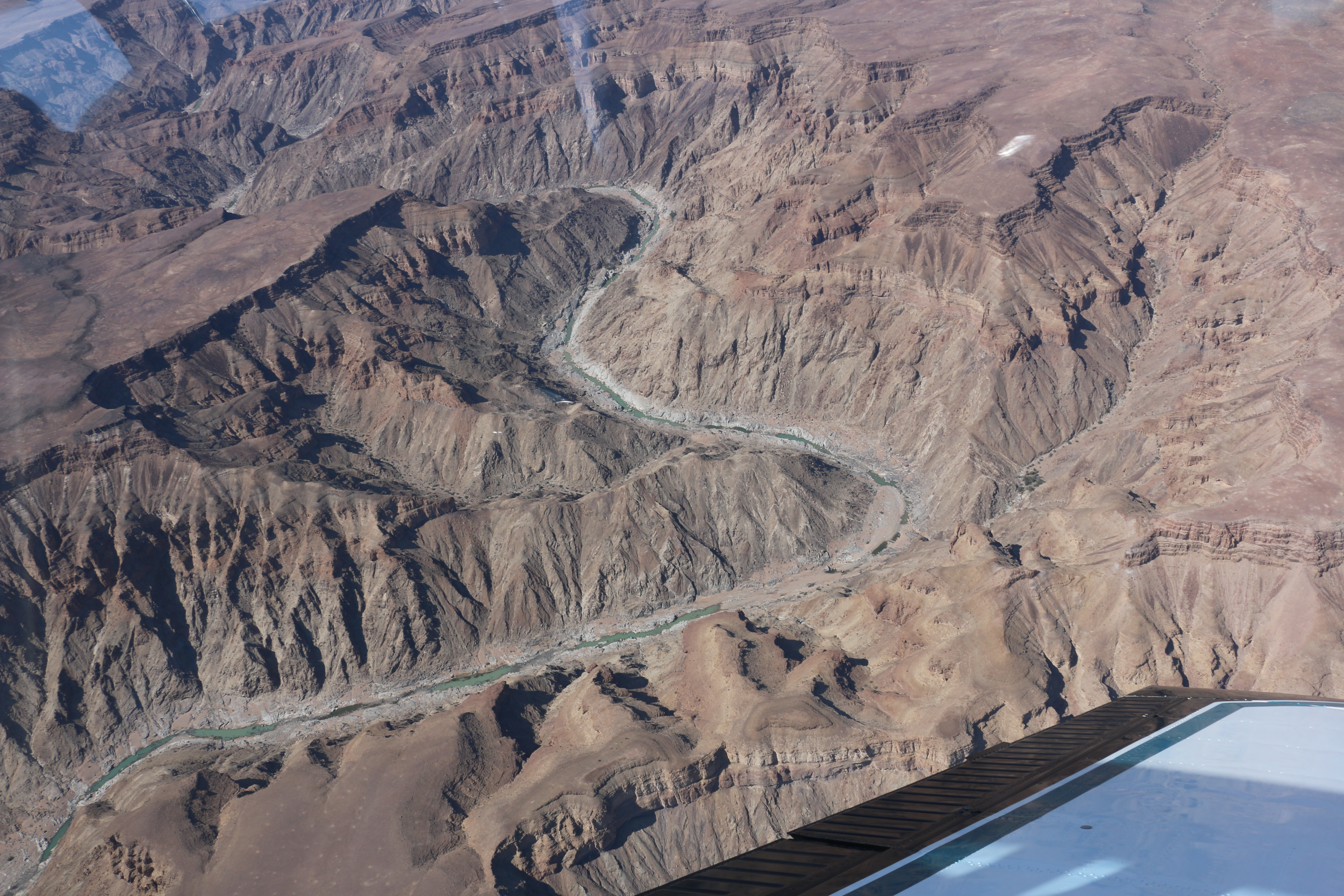
Fish River Canyon bird's eye view

The Fish River canyon consists of an upper canyon, where river erosion was inhibited by hard gneiss bedrocks, and a lower canyon formed after erosion had finally worn through the solid metamorphic rocks. Both parts have been declared a national monument in 1962.

Upstream, the river runs through horizontal dolomite strata; these metamorphic rocks form part of the canyon. About 650 million years ago (Mya), plate movement had formed a north-south graben, or lowered area, along which the ancient Fish River could flow and eventually erode a flat plain to create today's upper canyon. Glaciation at around 300 Mya, part of the Dyka glaciation during the Karoo Ice Age, further deepened the canyon. About 60 Mya, South America and Africa separated (due to continental drift) and Africa rose significantly; the consequentially increased gradient of the Fish River enabled it to erode the lower canyon into the hard gneisses, forming the current deeply twisting, meandering system of the lower canyon. With the separation of the continent Gondwana about 120 million years ago and the uplifting of the African continent, the gradient of the Fish River increased, allowing it to erode even deeper into the rock. Today the deepest point of the canyon is 549 metres deep.

== Hiking trail ==
Fish River Canyon Hiking trail
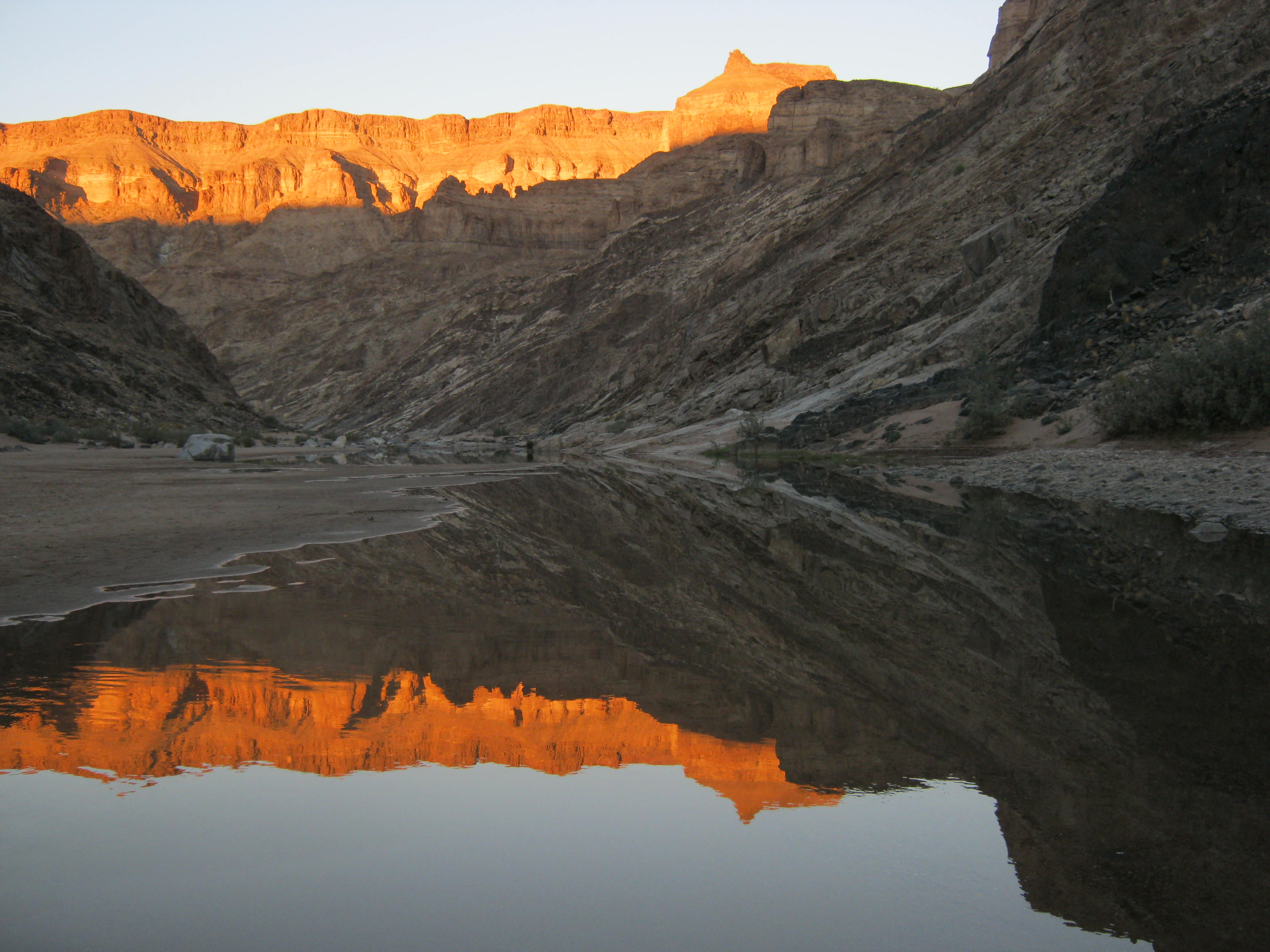
- Wild Fig Bend 27.638°S 17.599°E
- Length: 90 km (56 mi)
- Location: Fish River Canyon
- Trailheads: Hobas / ǀAi-ǀAis
- Use: Hiking / Trail running
- Elevation gain/loss: 620 m (Loss)
- Highest point: 840 m (2,760 ft)
- Lowest point: 220 m (720 ft)
- Difficulty: Medium
- Season: Winter in Southern Hemisphere
- Months: 1 May - 16 Sep
- Sights: Spectacular scenery, wildlife
- Hazards: Steep descent, boulders, rocks, deep sand, slippery river crossings, baboons, snakes, scorpions

The Fish River Canyon hiking trail is a popular hiking trail which runs through the canyon. The rugged terrain has drawn visitors from around the world.

Apart from the 2 kilometre descent west of Hobas and some optional short cuts, the trail generally follows 88 kilometres of the Fish River through to ǀAi-ǀAis and is usually completed within 5 days. Although there are a number of footpaths through the canyon, the trail is not fixed - leaving the hiker to decide where and how long to hike.

There are no amenities on the trail and hikers have to carry all their needs with them. Open fires are not allowed on the trail.

In times of inclement weather, some shelter in a run-down building can be found at the Causeway (27.829°S 17.571°E) but otherwise sleeping is outdoors.

The weather is usually mild and typical temperatures vary between 5 °C and 30 °C with little humidity. Extreme weather, such as flash floods, stormy winds and rain occasionally cause havoc during the hiking season.

=== Permits ===
Due to flooding and extremely hot summer temperatures reaching 48 °C during the day and 30 °C at night, permits are only issued between 1 May and 15 September.

Prior to arriving at Hobas a hiking permit must be obtained from Namibia Wildlife Resorts for groups not smaller than 3 and not larger than 30. All hikers must be older than 12 years and a certificate of fitness, completed by a medical doctor, must be presented at the offices of the Ministry of Environment and Tourism at Hobas.

In recent years the trail has become popular, particularly during school holidays and long weekends; therefore permits should be requested well in advance. Bookings for the following year's season open 1 May.

=== Trailhead campgrounds ===
Hobas (27.619°S 17.715°E) houses the Ministry of Environment and Tourism offices as well as Namibia Wildlife Resorts offices and a little shop for curiosities and basic necessities. Camping underneath Camelthorn trees with ablution blocks is available for hikers who plan to overnight at Hobas.

The trail ends at ǀAi-ǀAis where a resort with hotel rooms, chalets and camping grounds can be found.

A shuttle service runs approximately every three hours between ǀAi-ǀAis and Hobas. It should be booked in advance through the offices of Namibia Wildlife Resorts at ǀAi-ǀAis.

=== The trail ===
Trail Characteristics
Descent - Sulphur Springs

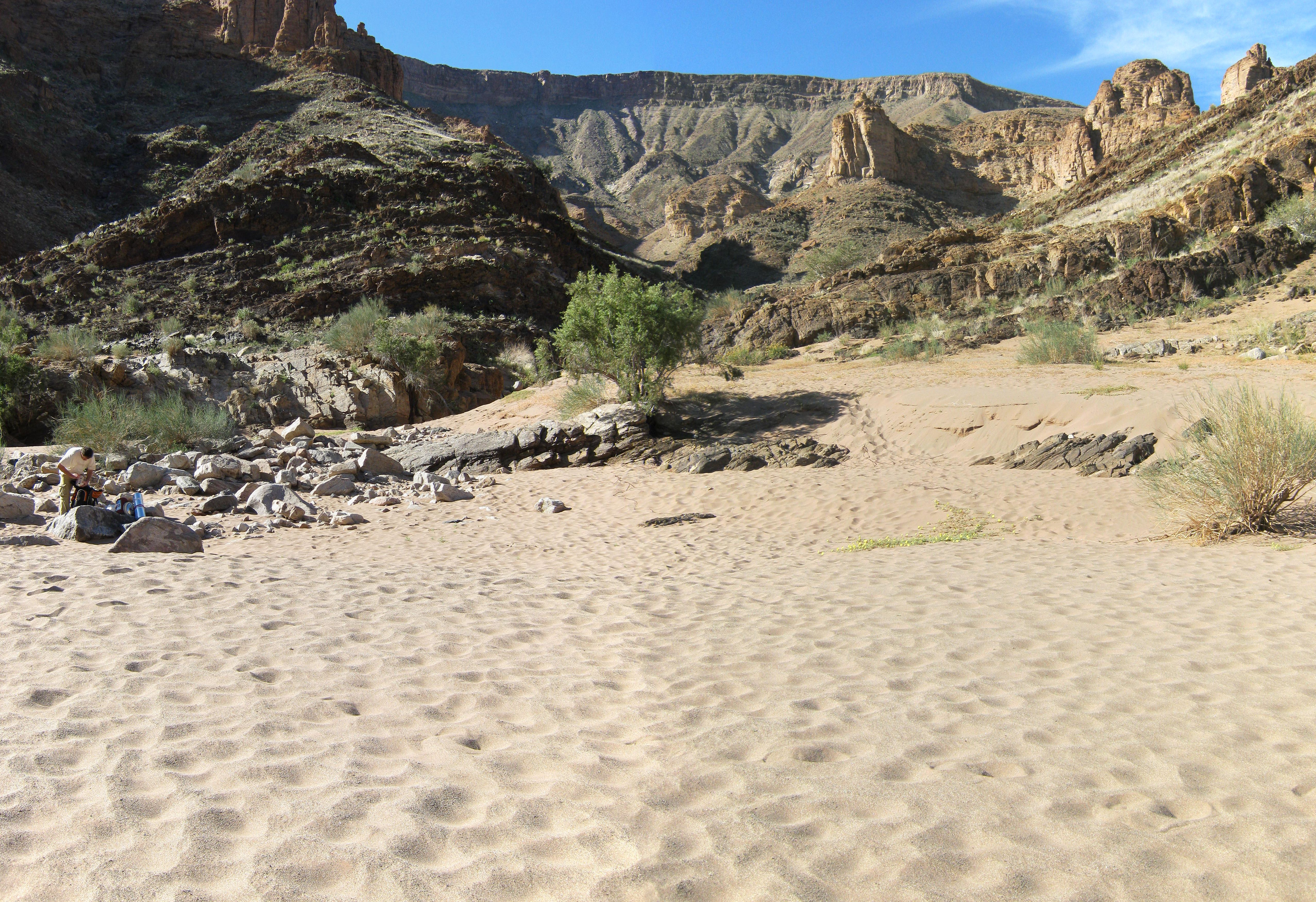
Deep Sand 27.588°S 17.598°E

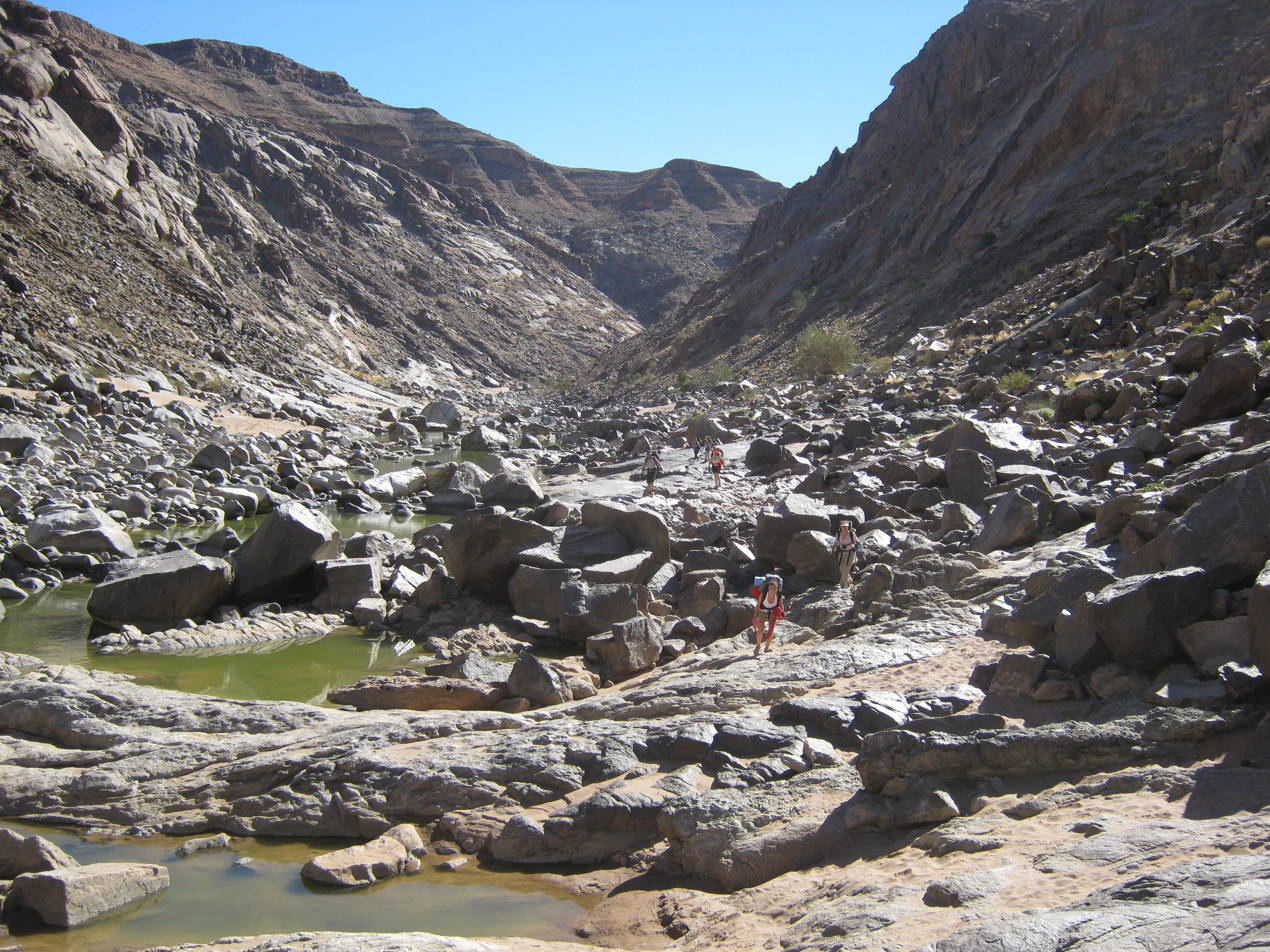
Boulders 27.627°S 17.606°E

Sulphur Springs - Three Sisters

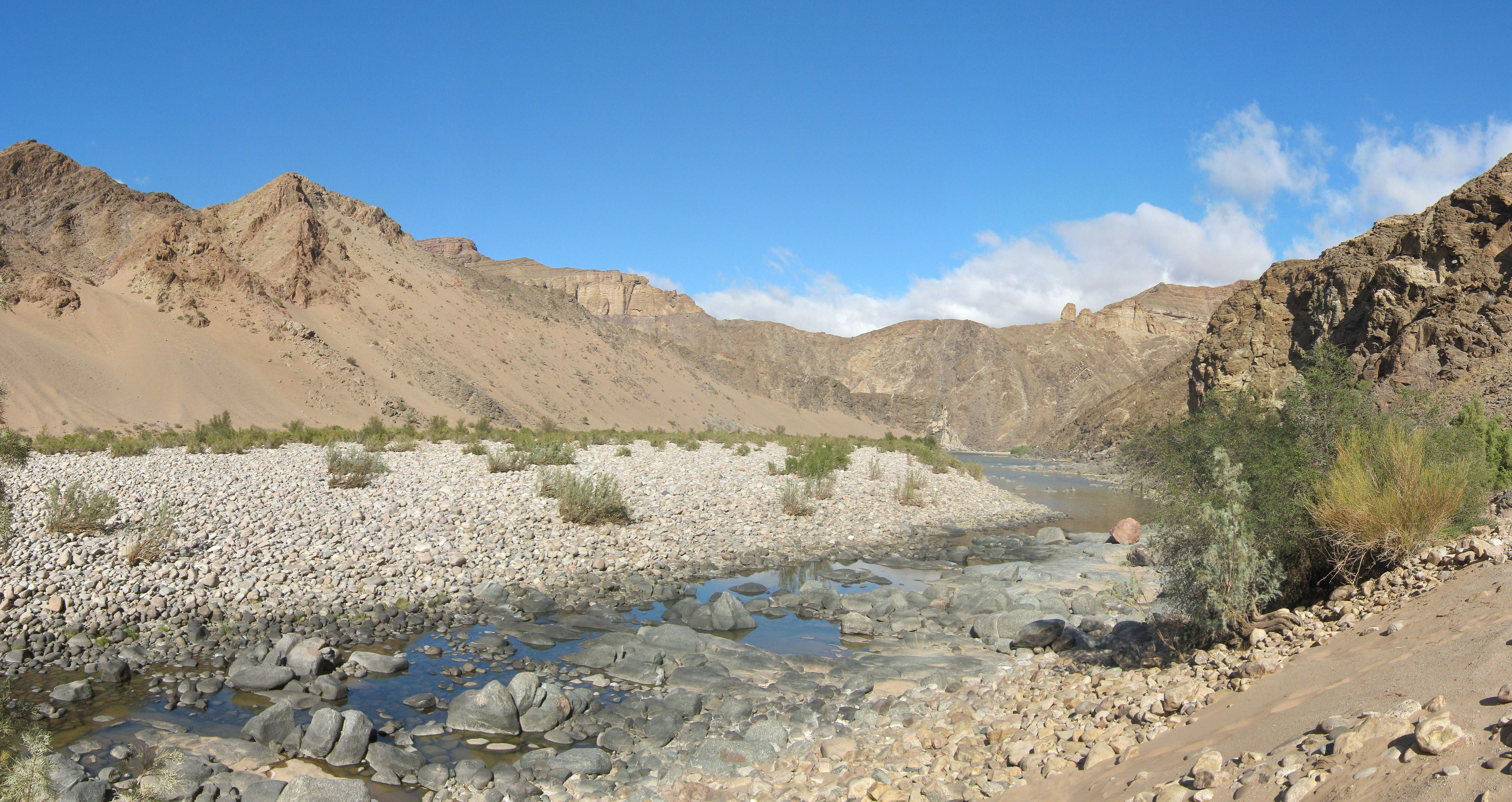
River Stones 27.717°S 17.581°E

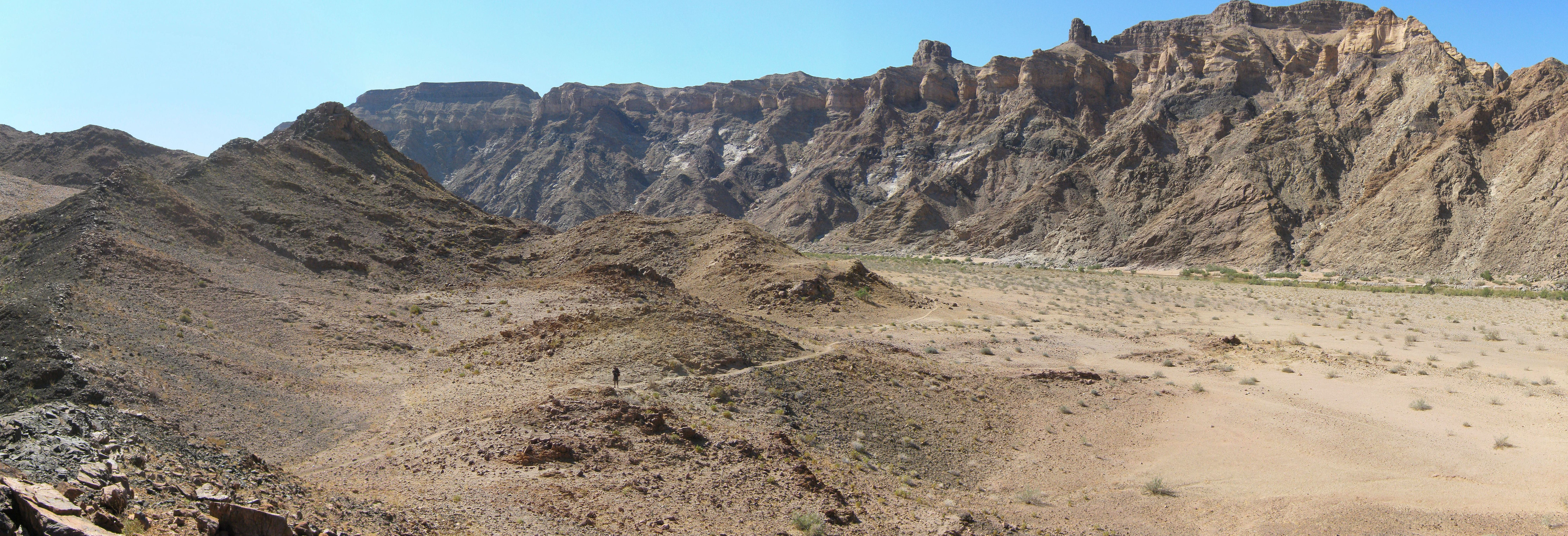
Firmer Ground 27.742°S 17.581°E

Three Sisters - Ai Ais

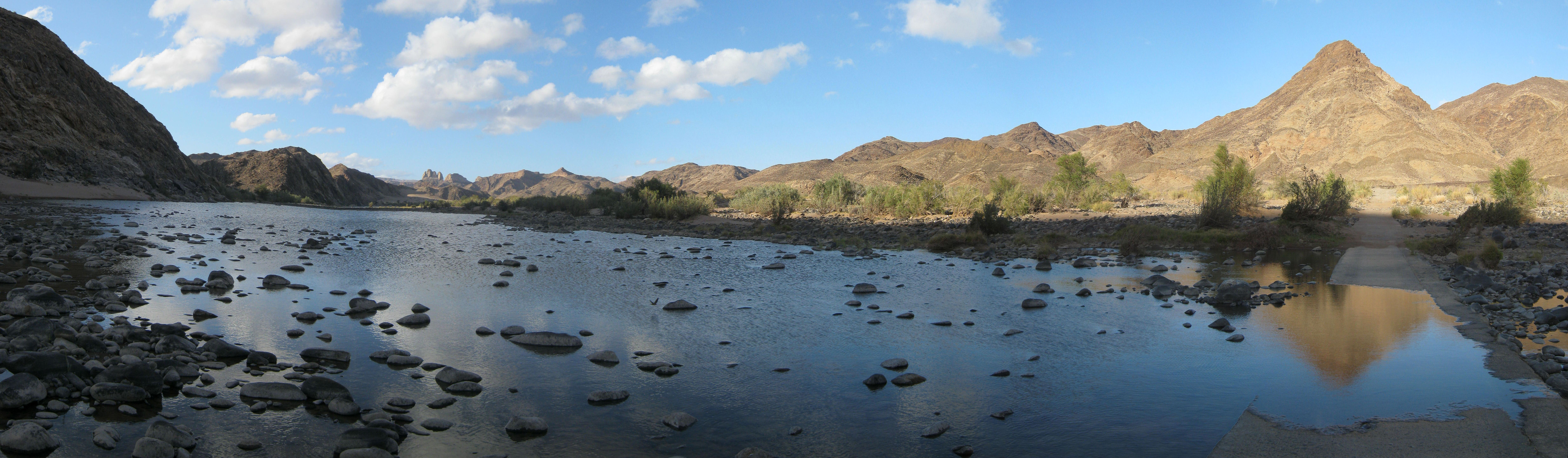
Widening Canyon 27.827°S 17.574°E

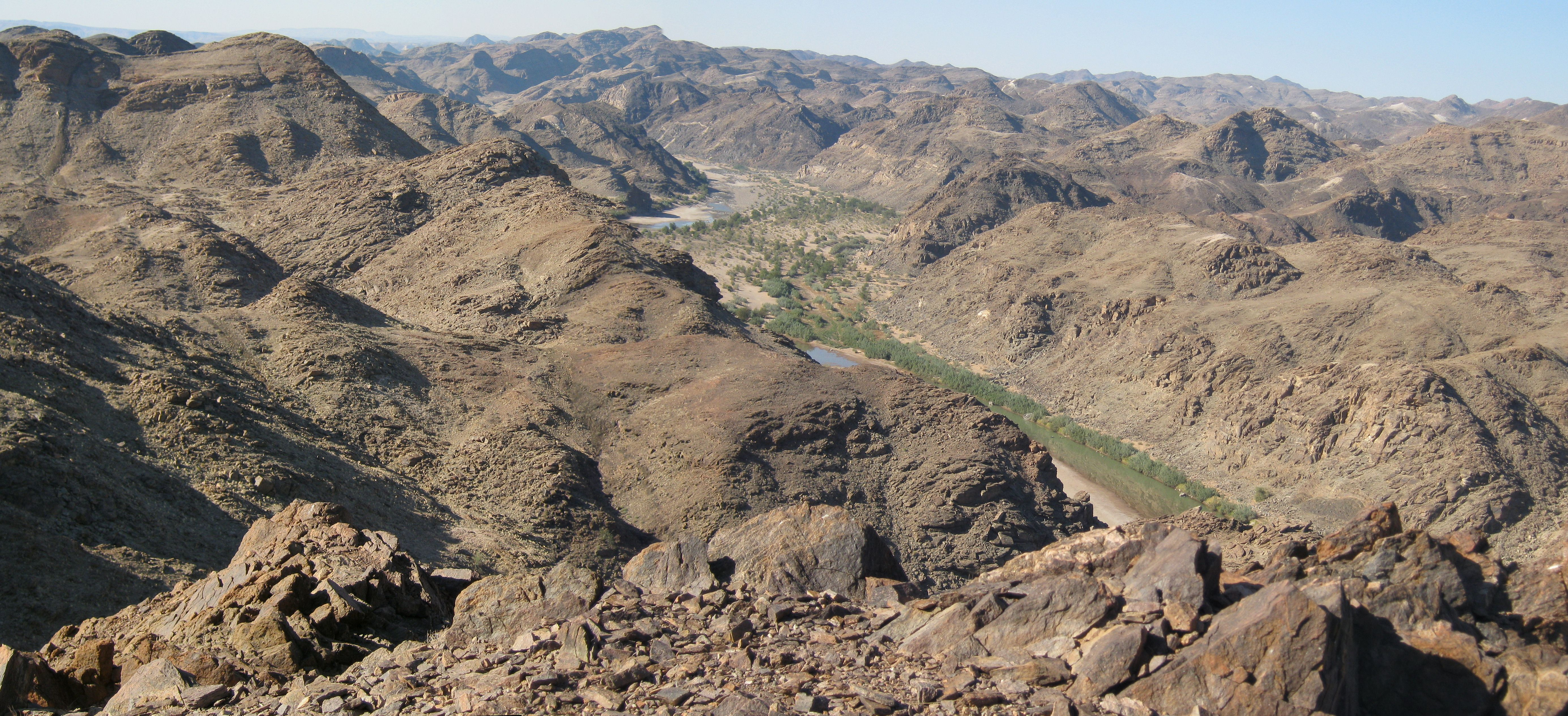
Trail end 27.905°S 17.498°E

The trail starts from the car park (27.577°S 17.609°E) 13 kilometres west from Hobas. The descent is steep and chains are provided to assist hikers over the first 100 meters. Thereafter the unmarked path follows a gravel trail to the river floor at the bottom (27.588°S 17.598°E). On the descent some misleading game trails lead to the north and should be avoided.

The trail can be divided into three notable sections:

- The descent down to Sulphur Springs (also known as Palm Springs) will take the hiker through the narrowest section of the canyon. Layered with big boulders, rocks and deep sand, making the journey slow and laborious, hiking the descent results in an average hiking speed between 6 and 10 kilometres per day.
- The route from Sulphur Springs to Three Sisters is mostly on firmer ground with plenty river stones and frequent river crossings. Average hiking speed is between 15 and 25 kilometres per day.
- From Three Sisters to ǀAi-ǀAis the canyon widens out with some sections reachable in 4x4 vehicles. Average hiking speed here is between 25 and 35 kilometres per day.

Optional short cuts are available. They offer little in beauty but may be a welcome change of scenery and terrain. Popular short cuts are found at:

- the 50 kilometer mark (27.775°S 17.593°E) before Three Sisters to cross over Kooigoed Ridge towards Barble Pools.
- from Barble Pools (27.793°S 17.588°E) to cross via Vasbyt Nek to the German Soldier's grave.
- Bandage pass (27.837°S 17.561°E) between the Causeway and Fool's Gold corner.

=== The river ===
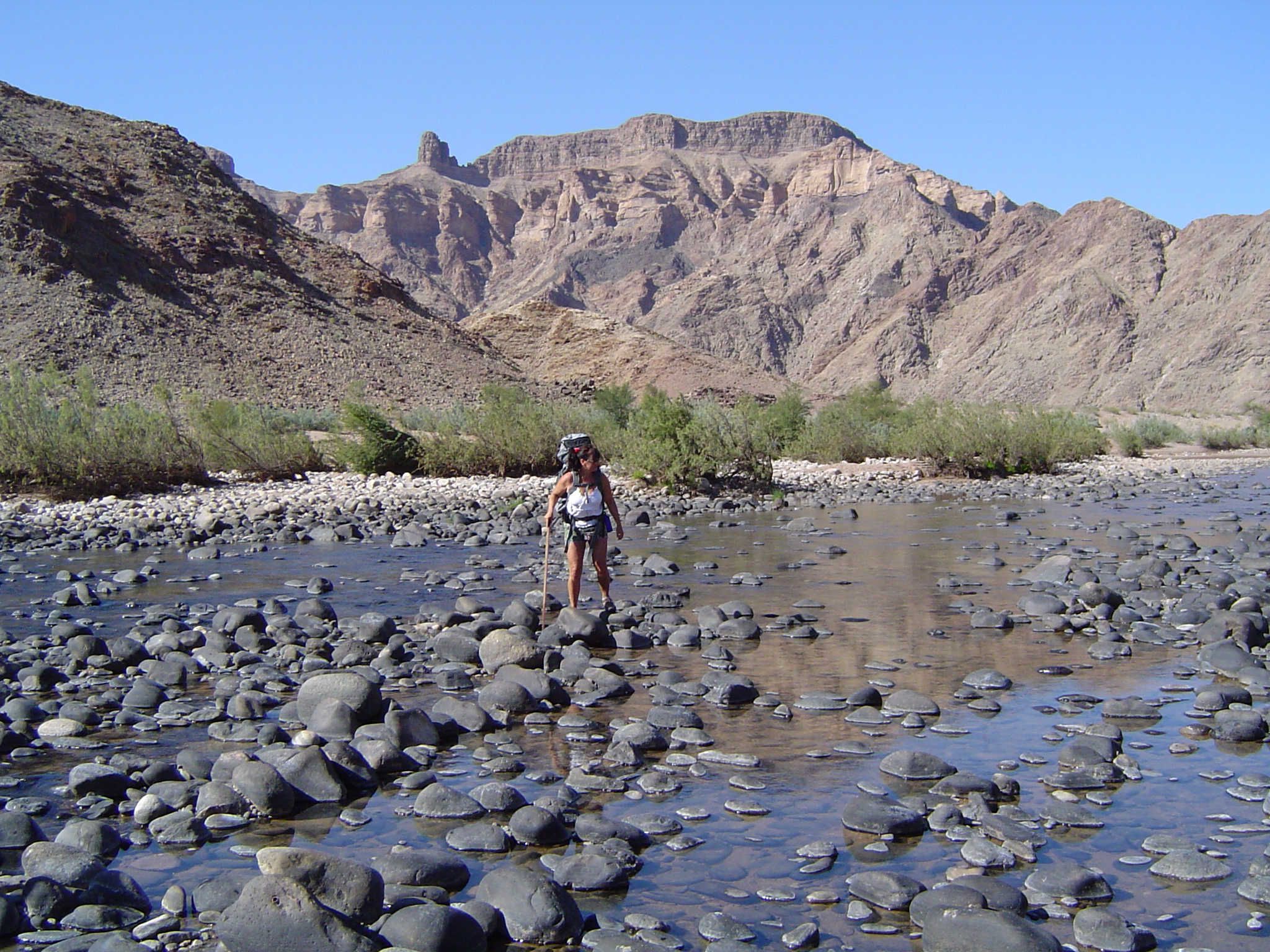
River Crossing 27.741°S 17.573°E

The river flows stronger early in the season and by September usually dries up to form a chain of stagnant pools. Water is safe to drink, however the use of water purifying tablets is recommended.

River crossings are a notable feature with more than 20 crossings over the course of the trail, and crossings may become a major consideration when water levels are high.

=== Emergencies ===
There is no mobile phone reception in the canyon and only two emergency exits are available. Evacuation from the deep canyon is done via stretcher on foot or helicopter and vehicles in the later parts of the trail. Emergency exits can be found:

- prior to Sulphur Springs at 27.650°S 17.609°E
- as a Jeep track at 27.819°S 17.587°E. This leads 10 kilometres further to the main road between Ai Ais and Hobas.

== Trail running in the Canyon ==
An international race along Fish River Canyon

Documented running through the canyon started in 1990. A group of hikers in running gear attempted to complete the 5 day, 90 kilometer hiking trail in 24 hours. They achieved their goal in a time of 11hrs 42min. In August 2003 this time was lowered to 10hrs 54min. In August 2012, after a previously abandoned attempt in 2011, Ryan Sandes completed the course in 6hrs 57min.

=== Hiking records ===
Date	Record Time	Runner(s)	Country
13 July 1990	11hrs 42min	Bruce Matthews, Ronnie Muhl	South Africa
16 August 2003	10hrs 54min	Russell Paschke, Charlie du Toit, Coenraad Pool and Tommy van Wyk	Namibia
3 August 2012	6hrs 57min	Ryan Sandes	South Africa
18 June 2016	6hrs 39min 52sec	AJ Calitz	South Africa

=== The Fish River Canyon Ultra Marathon ===
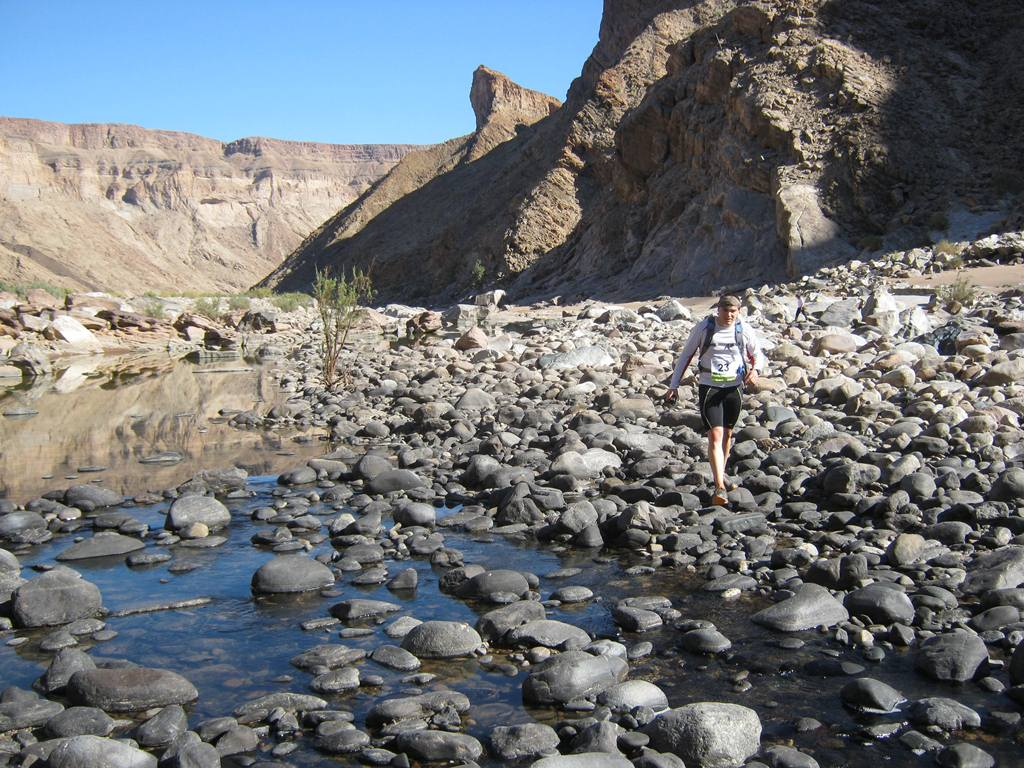
A contestant facing one of many technical sections through the Fish River Canyon 27.650°S 17.611°E

Unofficial running through the canyon has subsequently evolved into the annual Fish River Canyon Ultra Marathon which held its inaugural race on 27 August 2011.

This technical marathon follows most sections of the current hiking trail, testing the athlete's capabilities to the extreme.

The route starts close to Hobas and after a short section on the rim of the canyon steeply descends 500 meters to river level. Thereafter the contestants mostly follow the river to ǀAi-ǀAis. They are allowed to plan their own routes and take short-cuts through the canyon provided they reach a number of predefined checkpoints. Shortcuts may greatly reduce the total distance of the race but may also cost the contestant dearly in effort.

Due to the remoteness of the trail, all competitors are required to be self-sufficient for the duration of the event and are expected to have adequate nutrients as well as the stipulated survival gear. Water is generally sourced from the river which is always close by.

Previous trail runners have commented on the difficulty of the terrain: "The canyon is one of the most beautiful places I have seen but at the same time is one of the harshest environments I have run in. I really battled in the canyon due to the extreme heat and terrain and running in there was one of the toughest days of my athletic career." "This canyon is not for the faint hearted and an attempt to run it should not be taken light-heartedly."

==== Winners ====
===== Men's Ultra =====
Year	Approximate Distance	Winner	Time	Country
2019	100 km	AJ Calitz	08:57:42	South Africa
2018	100 km	AJ Calitz	08:28:45	South Africa
2017	100 km	AJ Calitz	08:55:09	South Africa
2016	100 km	Eric Tollner	11:32:08	South Africa
2015	100 km	AJ Calitz	08:04:41	South Africa
2014	100 km	AJ Calitz	08:04:15	South Africa
2013	100 km	Fanuel Thinyemba	10:26:10	Namibia
2012	100 km	Hanno Smit	10:11:33	South Africa

===== Women's Ultra =====
Year	Route Distance	Winner	Time	Country
2019	100 km	Risa Dreyer	11:25:55	Namibia
2018	100 km	Carine Gagiano	10:35:59	South Africa
2017	100 km	Sandra le Roux	14:17:56	South Africa
2016	100 km	Lubov Sych	13:21:19	Ukraine
2015	100 km	Charmain Salvage	11:54:14	South Africa
2014	100 km	Linda Doke	11:50:35	South Africa
2013	100 km	Kristinet van der Westhuizen	17:41:50	South Africa
2012	100 km	Sandie Rogerson	21:27:02	South Africa

===== Men's Lite =====
Year	Approximate Distance	Winner	Time	Country
2019	65 km	Laurie van Zyl	05:52:15	South Africa
2018	65 km	Rory Scheffer	05:13:49	South Africa
2017	65 km	Athanasius Muronga	08:06:24	Namibia
2016	65 km	Athanasius Muronga	06:13:48	Namibia
2015	65 km	Athanasius Muronga	06:24:39	Namibia
2014	65 km	Athanasius Muronga	07:31:34	Namibia
2013	65 km	Jacobus Diener	08:19:05	South Africa
		Joseph Kamungwe	08:19:05	Namibia
2011	83 km	Frans Amunyela	09:36:56	Namibia

===== Women's Lite =====
Year	Route Distance	Winner	Time	Country
2019	65 km	Julika Pahl	7:00:49	South Africa
2018	65 km	Alexandro Marco	8:30:43	Namibia
2017	65 km	Julia Jansen van Rensburg	8:45:09	South Africa
2016	65 km	Sandra le Roux	8:27:19	South Africa
2015	65 km	Georgina Ayre	8:45:45	South Africa
2014	65 km	Caley Loots	10:54:46	South Africa
2013	65 km	Koba Becker	13:31:25	Namibia
2011	83 km	Lisa de Speville	11:39:27	South Africa

== See also ==
- Blyde River Canyon
