= R358 (South Africa) =

Regional route in South Africa

Regional route R358
- R358 route map

Route information
- Length: 312 km (194 mi)

Major junctions
- North end: C10 at the Namibia-South Africa border at Onseepkans
- N14 in Pofadder; R355 south of Kliprand
- South end: N7 north of Bitterfontein

Location
- Country: South Africa
- Towns: Kliprand; Pofadder

Highway system
- Numbered routes of South Africa
| ← R357 | → R359 |

The R358 is a Regional Route in South Africa that connects the N7 north of Bitterfontein with the Namibian border at Onseepkans via Pofadder.

== Route ==
Starting from the N7 it heads north-east. It meets the R355 from the south-east and the two become co-signed. The routes cross into the Northern Cape before again diverging. Continuing north-east it reaches Pofadder after some 230 kilometres. Here it meets the N14 at a staggered junction. Leaving the town, it heads north to its terminus at Velloorsdrif Border Post at Onseepkans. Heading north into Namibia, the route continues as the C10.
