= B3 road (Namibia) =

National highway of Namibia

B3 road

- Map of the B3.

Route information
- Maintained by Roads Authority Namibia
- Length: 179 km (111 mi)

Major junctions
- East end: N10 at the South African border at Nakop
- West end: B1 at Grünau

Location
- Country: Namibia
- Towns: Ariamsvlei, Karasburg

Highway system
- Transport in Namibia
← B2	→ B4

B3 is a national highway of Namibia. It passes through the ǁKaras Region of Namibia in the south for 179 kilometres (111 mi), connecting the B1 at Grünau to the South African border at Nakop via the town of Karasburg. In South Africa the highway continues as the N10 towards Upington.
