= Pofadder, South Africa =

Pofadder
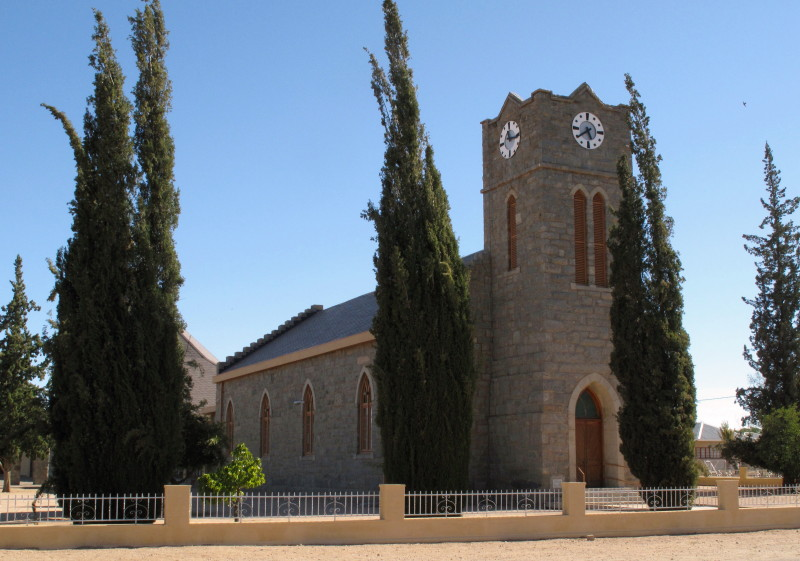
- Dutch Reformed Church in Pofadder
- Interactive map of Pofadder
- Location within Northern Cape Location within South Africa
- Coordinates: 29°7′43″S 19°23′41″E
- Country: South Africa
- Province: Northern Cape
- District: Namakwa
- Municipality: Khâi-Ma

Area
  - Total: 162.09 km^{2} (62.58 sq mi)
- Elevation: 992 m (3,255 ft)

Population (2011)
  - Total: 3,287
  - Density: 20.28/km^{2} (52.52/sq mi)

Racial makeup (2011)
  - Black African: 3.7%
  - Coloured: 89.8%
  - Indian/Asian: 0.5%
  - White: 5.4%
  - Other: 0.6%

First languages (2011)
  - Afrikaans: 95.2%
  - Xhosa: 1.0%
  - English: 1.0%
  - Other: 2.8%
- Time zone: UTC+2 (SAST)
- Postal code (street): 8890
- PO box: 8890
- Area code: 054
- Name pronunciation

Pofadder (Afrikaans for "puff adder") is a small town in the Northern Cape province of South Africa. In spite of its small size, it is an important local centre in the region known in South Africa as Bushmanland. The surrounding districts are arid, sparsely populated, rugged and picturesque. There is little in the way of cropping and local farmers run sheep or goats for a living. As a tourist destination, it is not sufficiently spectacular to rival the spring flowers of the coastal regions of Namaqualand, but it has its attractions for biologists and conservationists and those with an interest in its remarkable diversity of often-tiny xerophytes and animal life. In recent years, the town economy has been boosted by the construction and operation of solar power stations.

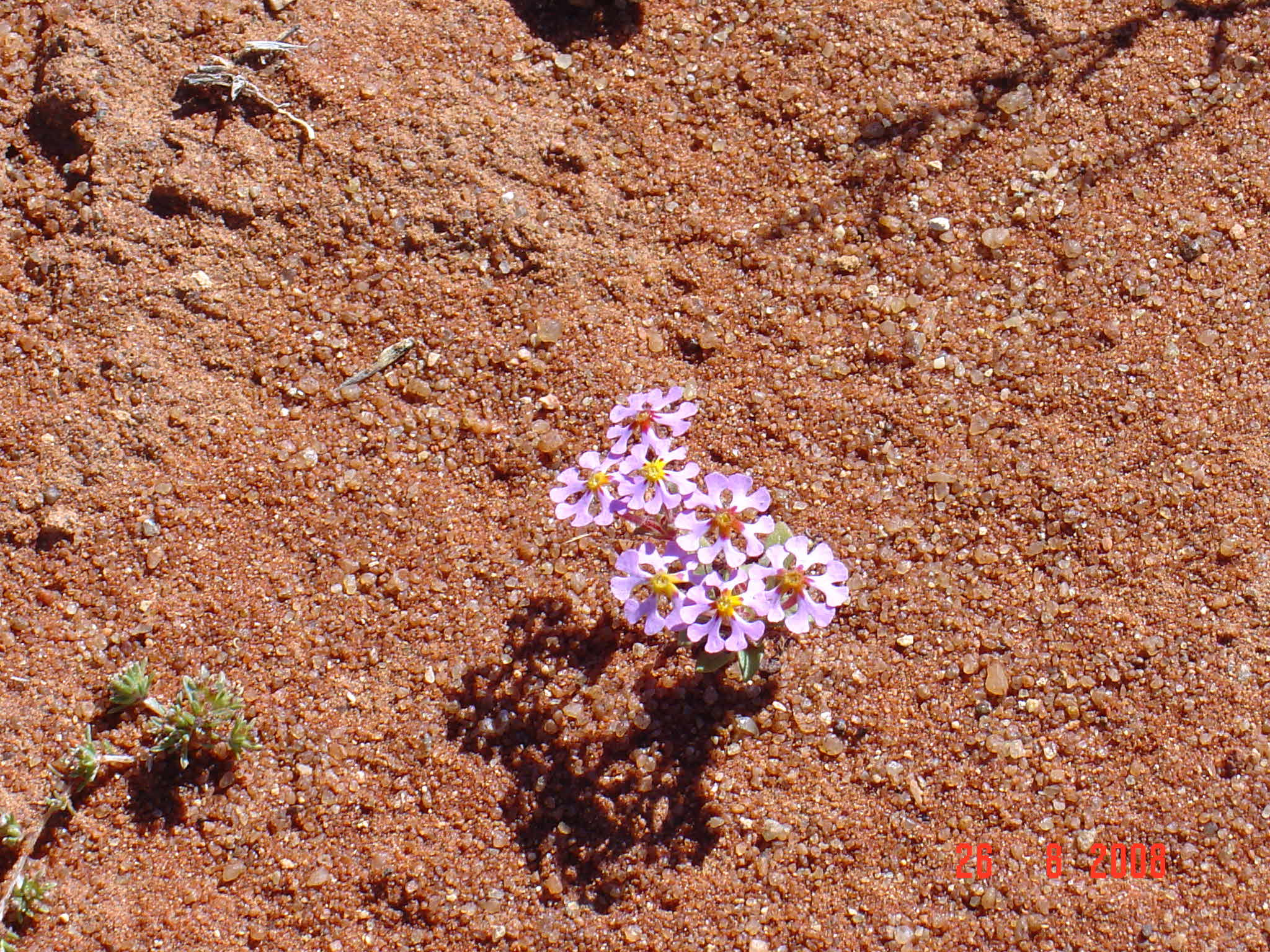
Zaluzianskya violacea in Bushmanland, less than 5 cm (2 in) across, flowering after unusual rains

Some claim that Pofadder was named after Klaas Pofadder, a local Koranna (Koi-Koi) tribal leader. Others maintain that this is an exercise in latter-day political correctness and that no record exists to prove that the village was not named after the venomous snake that is common enough in the district.

The settlement is situated on the N14 national road from Upington to Springbok and lies 50 km from the Onseepkans border post on the Namibian border, along the R358. Pofadder is near to the Ritchie Falls, the second highest waterfall on the Orange River, after the Augrabies Falls. Ritchie Falls are in a pristine wilderness area, only accessible after a two-day hike or by rafting down from Onseepkans. Guided hikes and rafting trips are available.

Like Kalamazoo and Timbuktu, the name "Pofadder" is used to represent somewhere very remote, far away and out of the mainstream of the world. This usage is most common in South Africa, while Timbuktu is used in most of the Commonwealth for this purpose and Kalamazoo in the United States. Putsonderwater is used in a similar way.
