= ǀAi-ǀAis/Richtersveld Transfrontier Park =

Transfrontier park in Namibia and South Africa

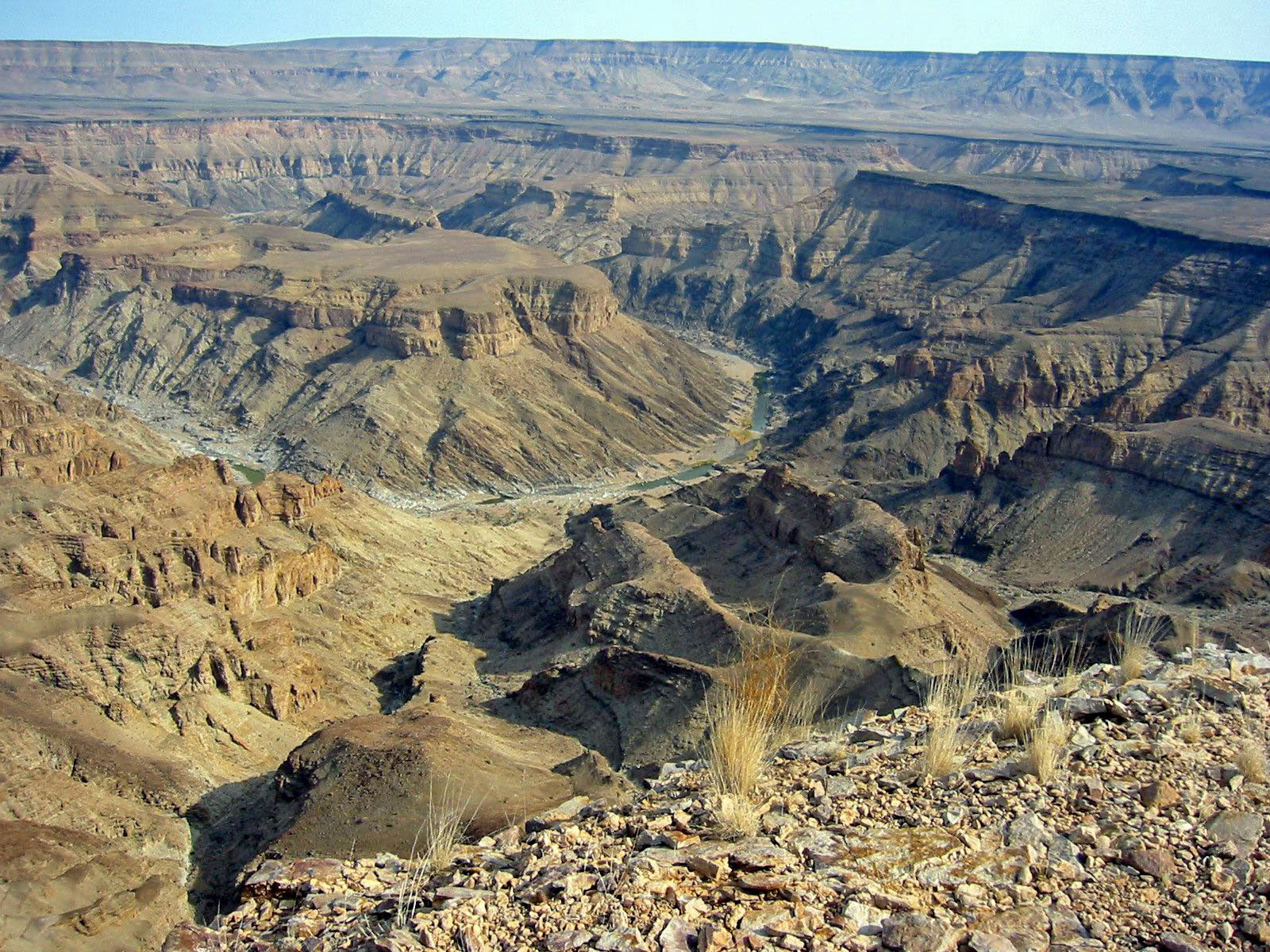
- Fish River Canyon
- Location of the park
- Location: ǁKaras Region; Namibia; Northern Cape; South Africa
- Nearest city: Rosh Pinah, Namibia; Alexander Bay, South Africa
- Coordinates: 28°03′14″S 17°02′05″E
- Area: 6,045 km^{2} (2,334 sq mi)
- Established: 2003
- Named for: ǀAi-ǀAis Hot Springs; Richtersveld
- Governing body: Ministry of Environment and Tourism (Namibia); South African National Parks
- Website: www.sanparks.org/parks/ai-ais-richtersveld
- ǀAi-ǀAis/Richtersveld Transfrontier Park (South Africa)

The ǀAi-ǀAis/Richtersveld Transfrontier Park is a peace park straddling the border between South Africa and Namibia. It was formed in 2003 by combining the Namibian ǀAi-ǀAis Hot Springs Game Park and the South African Richtersveld National Park. Most of the South African part of the park forms part of the buffer zone of the Richtersveld Cultural and Botanical Landscape World Heritage Site, which measures 5,920 square kilometres (2,290 sq mi). The Fish River Canyon, the largest canyon in Africa, is located in the park. A memorandum of understanding was signed on 17 August 2003 by the presidents of South Africa and Namibia, which formalised the establishment of the park. |Ai-|Ais is Khoekhoe for fire-fire, meaning 'hot as fire' or 'scalding hot', after the hot springs of the same name.

The Sendelingsdrift tourist facilities were opened in 2007 to enable tourists and locals to travel between Namibia and South Africa within the boundaries of the park. Immigration offices were set up on both sides of the Orange River. It is also known for being a biodiversity hotspot, which means it is under constant threat from human encroachment.

== Nama people ==
The Nama people can still be found in the region. Known for being nomadic pastoralists, their way of life is suited for the arid region. Herders and their livestock can be seen moving over long distances, as they try to anticipate the much needed yet sparse rainfall. The Nama language has also been preserved here by the Nama communities more than any other place in the Namaqualand region.

== Climate ==
The |Ai-|Ais/Richtersveld has two major climatic systems. It has a temperate winter rainfall region that also contains high air humidity, contrasted by the high temperature with its summer rains yet low humidity further inland. These contrasting climates have a transitional zone of about 20 kilometres (12 mi).

== Landscape ==
The general area consists of rugged valleys and high mountains. The land is harsh, while water is generally scarce, the air is kept moist by early morning fog. The Nama locals call the fog that comes in from the Atlantic Ocean ‘Ihuries’ or ‘Malmokkies’. The park is regarded as a unique mega-ecosystem in the world. In a one square kilometre area more than 360 different plant species can be found in a place that experiences an average rainfall of only 68 mm per year. The vegetation in |Ai-|Ais/Richtersveld Transfrontier Park consists of unique plant life, such as the giant quiver tree, ‘half-mens’ (Afrikaans: half human), and tall aloes. The half-mens is typified by an unbranched, cylindrical stem, which can reach heights of up to 4m. The top has a tuft of branches. The local Nama community hold the half-mens tree in high regard, believing that the human-like figure it assumes is their ancestors longing for the Namibian home.

Map of the park
