= ǀAi-ǀAis =

- Holiday resort
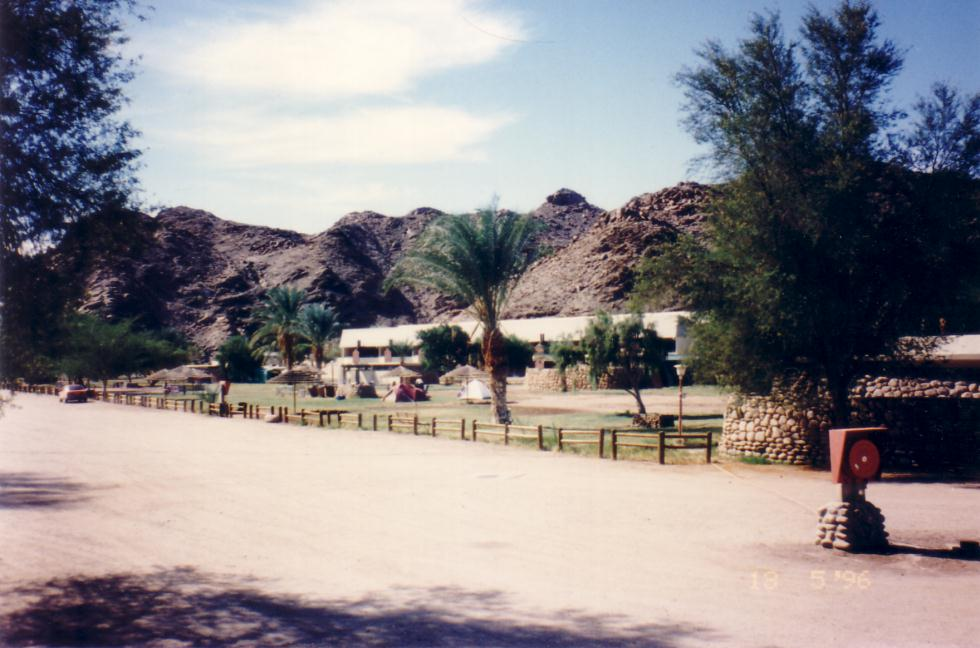
- ǀAi-ǀAis Hot Springs resort, 1996

- Location within Namibia
- Coordinates: 27°55′43″S 17°29′0″E
- Country: Namibia
- Region: ǁKaras Region
- Resort opened: 16 March 1971

Government
  - Body: Ministry of Environment and Tourism

Area
  - Total: 5,900 km^{2} (2,300 sq mi)
- Time zone: UTC+2 (SAST)

ǀAi-ǀAis (Khoekhoe: fire-fire, meaning 'hot as fire' or 'scalding hot') is a Namibian holiday resort with hot mineral springs in the bed of the Fish River. It is situated in Southern Namibia's ǁKaras Region at the base of the Great Karas Mountains, 128 kilometres (80 mi) west of Karasburg and 224 kilometres (139 mi) south-west of Keetmanshoop.

ǀAi-ǀAis features sulfurous thermal hot water springs and forms part of the ǀAi-ǀAis/Richtersveld Transfrontier Park. The springs have been a national monument since 1964.

== History ==
Local legend goes that the hot springs were discovered in 1850 by a nomadic Nama shepherd rounding up stray sheep. The springs originate deep under the riverbed and form an oasis in the extremely arid area.

During the Nama uprising of 1903–07 the hot spring was used by German military forces as a base camp. In 1915, the area was also used as a base by South African troops who were recovering from wounds during the South West Africa Campaign. In 1962, the spring was leased to a local entrepreneur and were subsequently proclaimed a national monument in 1964. A rest camp was opened in 1965. In 1969, the springs became a conservation area and on 16 March 1971, the camp was officially opened. The thermal water has an average temperature of about 60 °C. The water is piped to a series of indoor pools and jacuzzis.

Severe floods in 1972, 1974 and 1988 caused the camp to temporarily close. With the exception of one building—which was situated on higher ground—the 1972 flood totally destroyed the camp. The Fish River Canyon Conservation area was enlarged in 1987 by the addition of state land west of the canyon. Significant renovations to the Ai-Ais camp were carried out in 1987–88.

An international treaty, signed in 2003, incorporated the vast area around the ǀAi-ǀAis Hot Springs and Richtersveld National Park in South Africa, resulting in the establishment of the ǀAi-ǀAis/Richtersveld Transfrontier Park.

== Present day ==
The springs are a popular holiday destination for Namibian, South African and international holiday-makers. The thermal waters are rich in sulphur, chloride and fluoride, and are reputedly good for anyone suffering from rheumatism. The resort waters are also home to a number of species of fish, including yellowfish and barbel. ǀAi-ǀAis is the end point of a 5-day hiking tour through the Fish River Canyon.

== Gallery ==
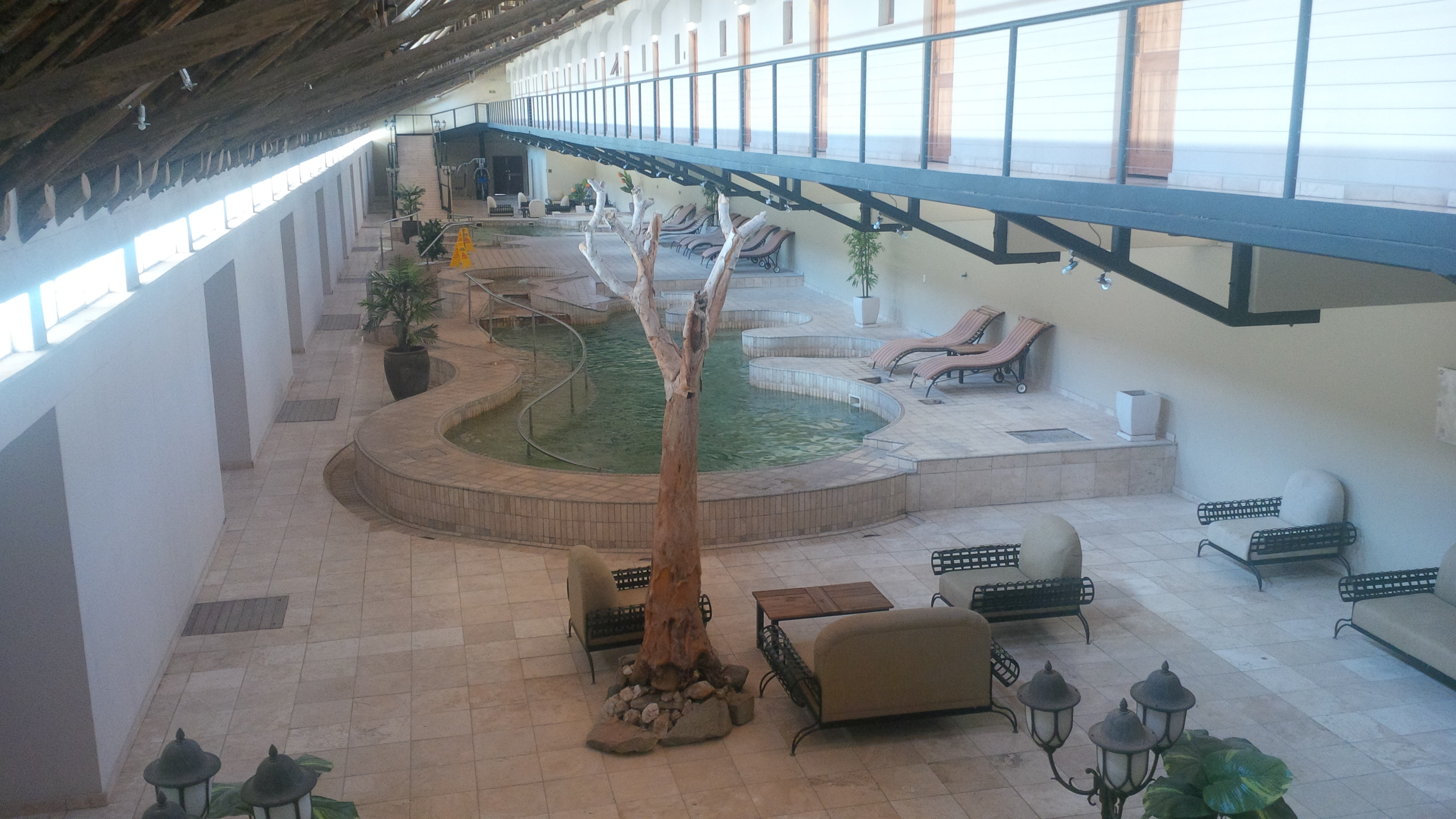
ǀAi-ǀAis Spa, 2015.

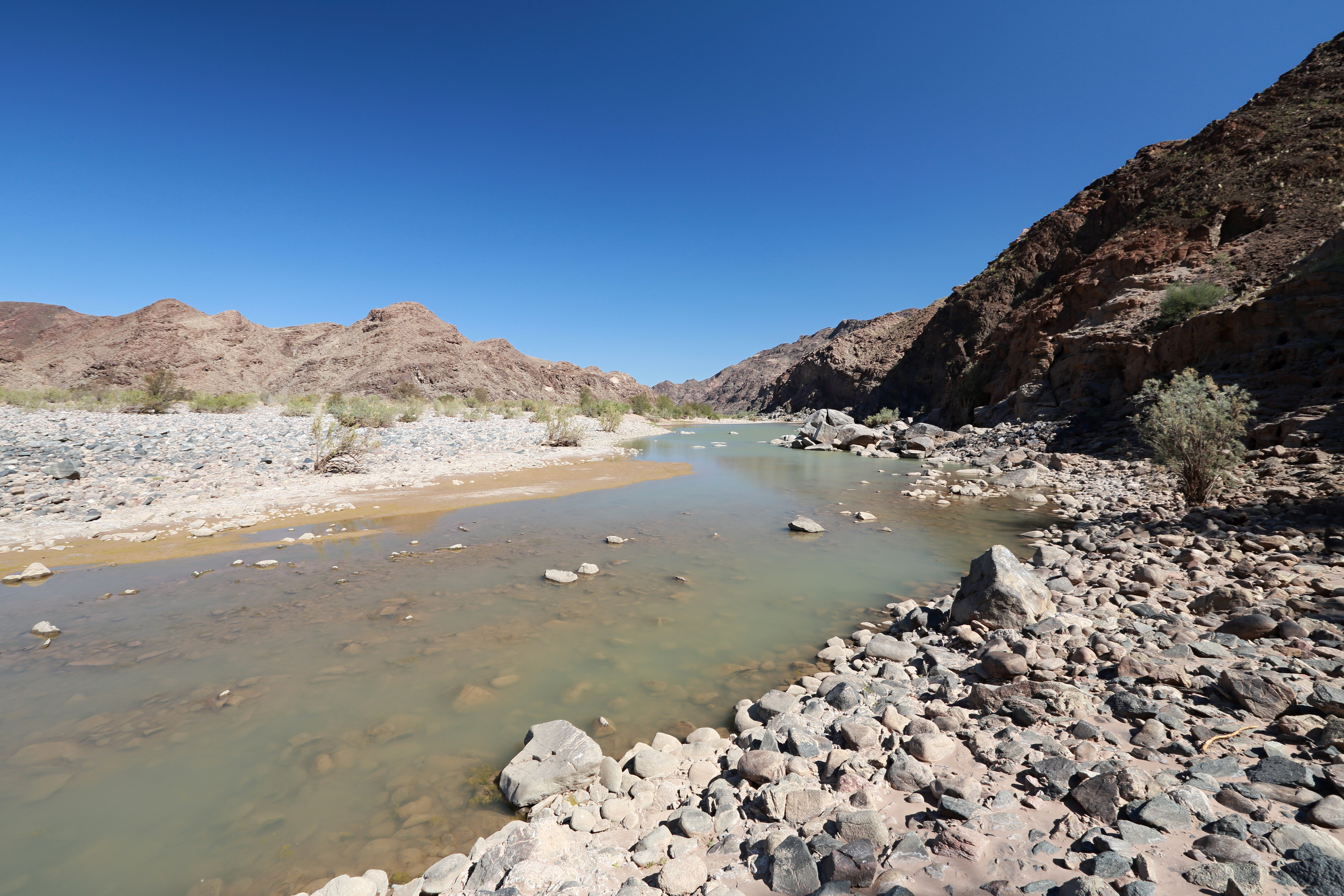
Fish River Canyon, 2014.

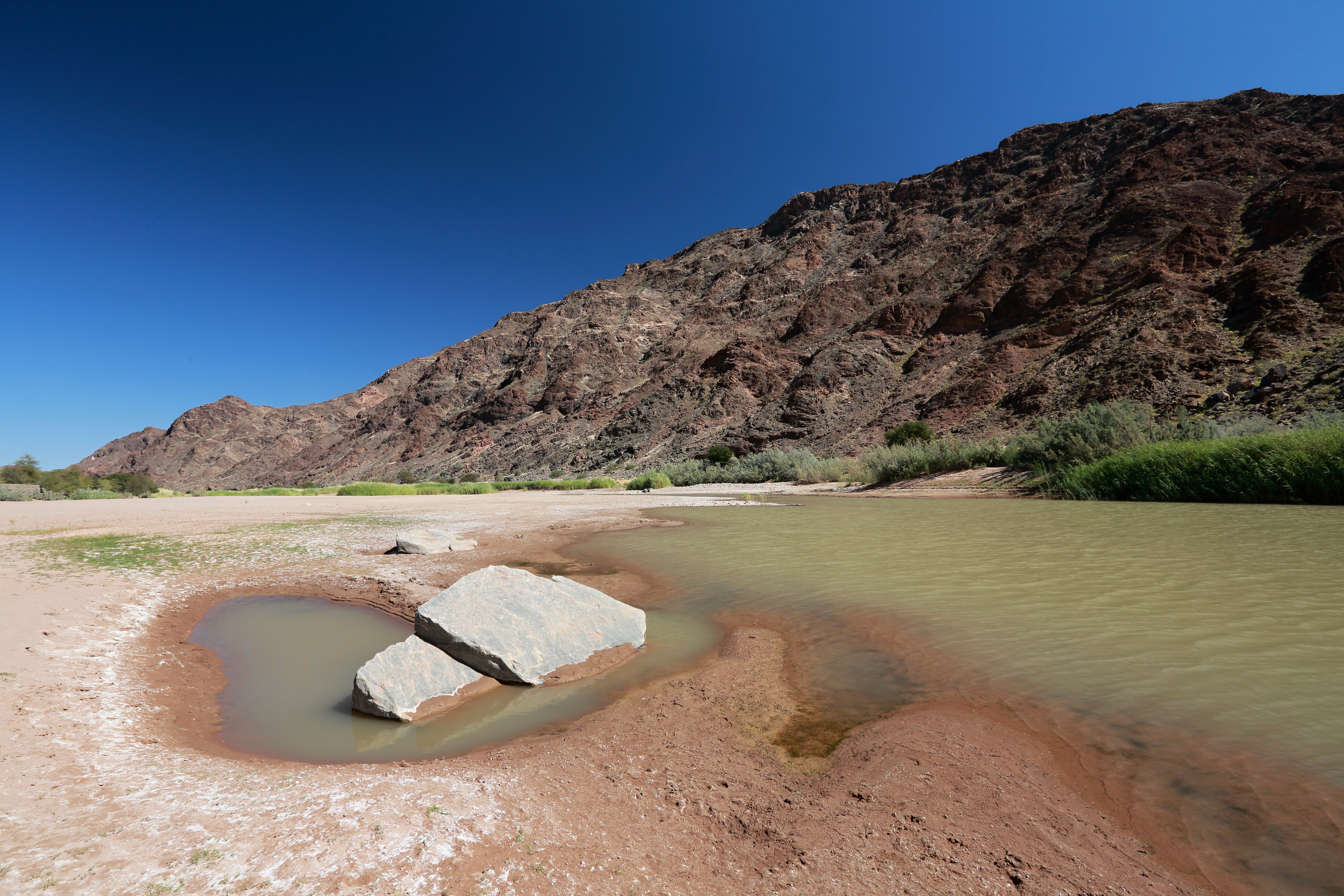
Fish River Canyon, 2014.

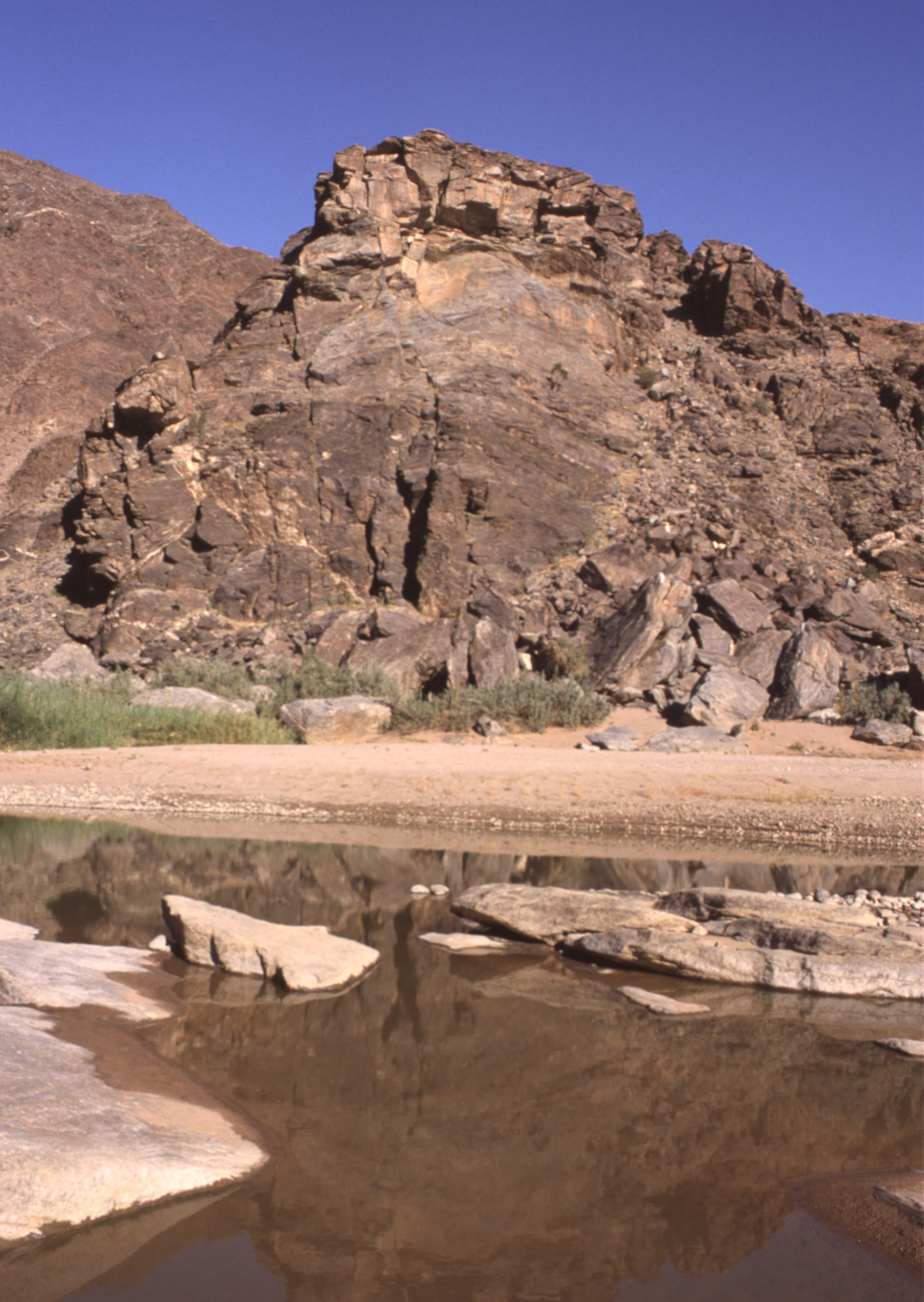
Fish River Canyon, 2002.

== See also ==
- Richtersveld
- Peace park
- List of national parks in Africa
