= Ariamsvlei =

- Settlement
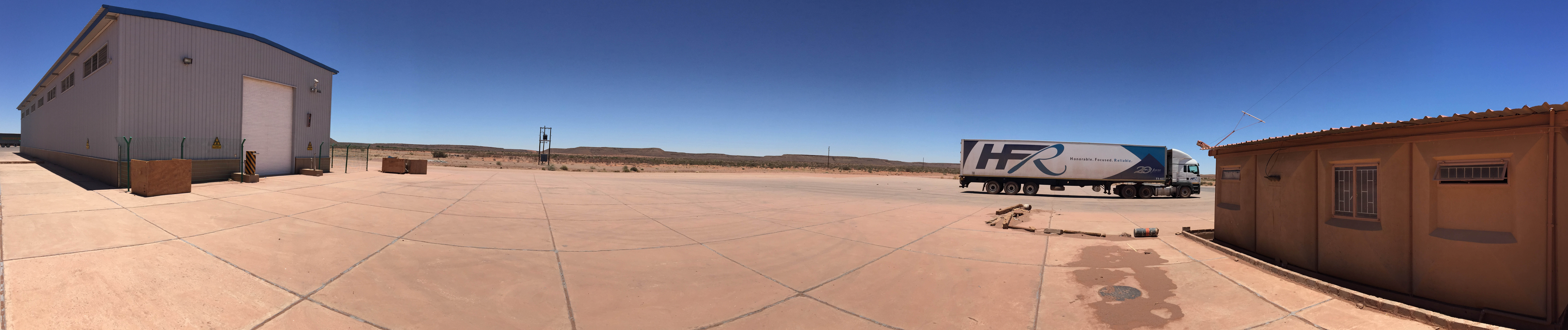
- Borderpost at Ariamsvlei

- Location in Namibia
- Coordinates: 28°7′S 19°49′E
- Country: Namibia
- Region: ǁKaras Region
- Constituency: Karasburg Constituency

Population (2016)
  - Total: 500 to 600
- Time zone: UTC+2 (South African Standard Time)

Ariamsvlei is a settlement of about 500 people in the ǁKaras Region of southern Namibia and a border post between Namibia and South Africa, located 110 km (68 mi) east of Karasburg on the national B3 road. It lies at 804 metres (2,638 ft) above sea level.

The border post with South Africa lies 1.2 kilometres (1,300 yd) to the east of the settlement; however, the actual border (at the 20th meridian east) lies 15.3 km (9.5 mi) further east along the B3, near the South African settlement of Nakop. South Africa's border post (also named Nakop) is located a further 1.3 km (1,400 yd) away.

Ariamsvlei is an important rest stop for long-distance trucks, and a railway stop on the line between Windhoek and Upington. It belongs to the Karasburg electoral constituency. The settlement has a petrol station, a shop, and a restaurant.

Upon independence of Namibia Ariamsvlei was a village, governed by a seven-seat village council. The first local election run in Namibia, the 1992 Namibian local elections, was won by SWAPO which gained 70 votes and four seats, followed by the opposition Democratic Turnhalle Alliance (DTA) which gained 48 votes and three seats. The village status of Ariamsvlei was revoked before the 1998 local authority elections, so that it came under the governance of the ǁKharas Regional Council.
