= Onseepkans =

- Location within Northern Cape Location within South Africa
- Coordinates: 28°44′39″S 19°18′44″E
- Country: South Africa
- Province: Northern Cape
- District: Namakwa
- Municipality: Khâi-Ma

Area
  - Total: 27.65 km^{2} (10.68 sq mi)

Population (2011)
  - Total: 2,090
  - Density: 75.6/km^{2} (196/sq mi)

Racial makeup (2011)
  - Black African: 18.9%
  - Coloured: 78.1%
  - Indian/Asian: 0.4%
  - White: 1.5%
  - Other: 1.0%

First languages (2011)
  - Afrikaans: 84.1%
  - Tswana: 12.9%
  - Other: 3.0%
- Time zone: UTC+2 (SAST)
- PO box: 8892
- Area code: 054

Onseepkans is a small settlement on the banks of the Orange River in Northern Cape Province, South Africa. It is a border post with Namibia for traffic between Pofadder in South Africa and Keetmanshoop in Namibia. The name either originated from a combination of three Nama words: ‘tconsiep’ (an elbow projecting into the river), ‘nias’ (a rocky surface), and ‘tcaans’ (thorntrees), or a derivative of a nama word that means 'watering place for cattle'.

In 1909, a prospector by the name of Edwells settled in the area. The land was eventually bought from him in 1916 by a group of farmers, who saw potential for irrigation in the area. Ecotourism has been growing ever since the establishment of a riverside campsite and various farm cottages. It is also the entry point for visits to the Ritchie Falls, the second highest waterfall on the Orange River, after the Augrabies Falls. The Ritchie Falls are in a pristine wilderness area, only accessible after a two-day hike or by rafting down from Onseepkans. Guided hikes and rafting trips are available. The falls (both Augrabies and Ritchie) are threatened by the development of a hydro power station proposed by a consortium between Hydro Tasmania and Hydro South Africa, despite the fact that only 10% of the Orange River is considered to be pristine wilderness.

From 1969 onwards, there were 2 companies of SADF Border Guards located at the town, co-located with an Operating Signals Regiment of the SADF Air Force.

There are small communities on both sides of the Orange River in one of the most remote parts of the country. The Quiver tree (Kokerboom in Afrikaans) forest between Pofadder and Onseepkans is the largest forest of its type in the Southern Hemisphere.

The area is very hot. Summer temperatures can exceed 50 °C while in the middle of winter temperatures in the high 30s can still be experienced. To reach the settlement one has to travel 49 kilometers along the R358 from Pofadder.
