= Kommadagga =

- Location within Eastern Cape Location within South Africa
- Coordinates: 33°07′08″S 25°54′04″E
- Country: South Africa
- Province: Eastern Cape
- District: Sarah Baartman
- Municipality: Blue Crane Route
- Time zone: UTC+2 (SAST)
- PO box: 5800

Kommadagga is a settlement 28 kilometres (17 mi) west-north-west of Riebeek East and 49 kilometres (30 mi) north of Paterson. The name is Khoikhoi and means 'in search of dagga'..

The Anglican church of St. George, Kommadagga is on the farm Three Fountains.
