= Nakop =

- Location within Northern Cape Location within South Africa
- Coordinates: 28.0919°S 20.01°E
- Country: South Africa
- Province: Northern Cape
- District: ZF Mgcawu
- Municipality: Kai !Garib

Area
  - Total: 1.02 km^{2} (0.39 sq mi)

Population (2001)
  - Total: 315
  - Density: 309/km^{2} (800/sq mi)

Racial makeup (2001)
  - Coloured: 100.0%

First languages (2001)
  - Afrikaans: 100%
- Time zone: UTC+2 (SAST)
- Area code: 054

Nakop is a small town and border post in northwestern South Africa on its border with Namibia. It lies ten kilometres north of the Orange River. In August 1914, the town was the site of the first conflict between German and South African troops in World War I over control of German South West Africa.

	South Africa	Namibia
Region	Northern Cape	
Nearest town	Nakop	Ariamsvlei
Road	N10	B3
GPS Coordinates	28.0919°S 20.01°E	28.0919°S 20.01°E
Telephone number	+27 (0)54 571 0008 / 0077	
Fax number	+27 (0)54 571 0009	
Postal address		
Business hours	24 hours	24 hours
