= R31 (South Africa) =

Road in South Africa

Provincial route R31

Route information
- Maintained by NCDRPW and SANRAL
- Length: 641 km (398 mi)

Major junctions
- West end: C16 at the Namibian border near Rietfontein
- N14 in Kuruman; N8 near Kimberley
- East end: N12 near Kimberley

Location
- Country: South Africa
- Major cities: Andriesvale, Van Zylsrus, Hotazel, Kuruman, Daniëlskuil, Barkly West, Kimberley

Highway system
- Numbered routes of South Africa
← R30	→ R33

The R31 is a provincial route in the Northern Cape of South Africa that connects Kimberley with the Namibian border at Rietfontein via Kuruman and Hotazel. It is co-signed with the R360 between Askham and Andriesvale.

Some sections of this road are gravel road.

== Route ==
Detailed Route

The R31 begins in Kimberley (capital of the Northern Cape), south-west of the city centre, at an intersection with the N12 national route. It begins by going north-north-west through the western area of Kimberley, meeting the R357 road at the next junction and the N8 national route at the following junction.

From the N8 junction in Kimberley, the R31 goes north-north-west for 31 kilometres, passing by the Wildebeest Kuil Rock Art Centre, to cross the Vaal River and enter the town of Barkly West, where it meets the southern terminus of the R374 road and passes through in a westerly direction.

From Barkly West, the R31 goes north-west for 28 kilometres, following the Vaal River, to cross the Harts River and reach a junction with the R370 road near Delportshoop. From the R370 junction, the R31 goes west for 79 kilometres, through Koopmansfontein, to reach a junction with the R385 road south of Daniëlskuil. At this junction, the R31 turns northwards and proceeds to enter Daniëlskuil.

From Daniëlskuil, the R31 goes northwards for 72 kilometres, passing by the Wonderwerk Cave, to meet the western terminus of the R372 road. It goes northwards for a further 8 kilometres to enter the town of Kuruman, where it meets the N14 national route in the town centre.

From Kuruman, the R31 goes north-west for 57 kilometres to meet the R380 road at a junction. The R380 joins the R31 and they are one road north-west for 16 kilometres, bypassing Hotazel, before the R31 becomes its own road westwards. From the R380 junction near Hotazel, the R31 goes west-north-west for 95 kilometres to the town of Van Zylsrus.

From Van Zylsrus, the R31 goes westwards for 148 kilometres, following the Kuruman River, to reach a t-junction with the R360 road in the town of Askham. The section between Van Zylsrus and Askham is a gravel road. The R31 joins the R360 and they are one road westwards for 13 kilometres up to a junction in Andriesvale, adjacent to the Molopo River and Kuruman River confluence (south of the Gemsbok Border with Botswana), where the R360 becomes the road northwards towards the Kgalagadi Transfrontier Park while the R31 remains as the road westwards.

From the R360 junction in Andriesvale, the R31 goes westwards for 70 kilometres, through Klein Mier, bypassing the Hakskeenpan, to enter the town of Rietfontein. It passes through as the main road before reaching the Rietfontein Border Post with Namibia, where it becomes the C16 road to Keetmanshoop.
