= Askham, South Africa =

Askham
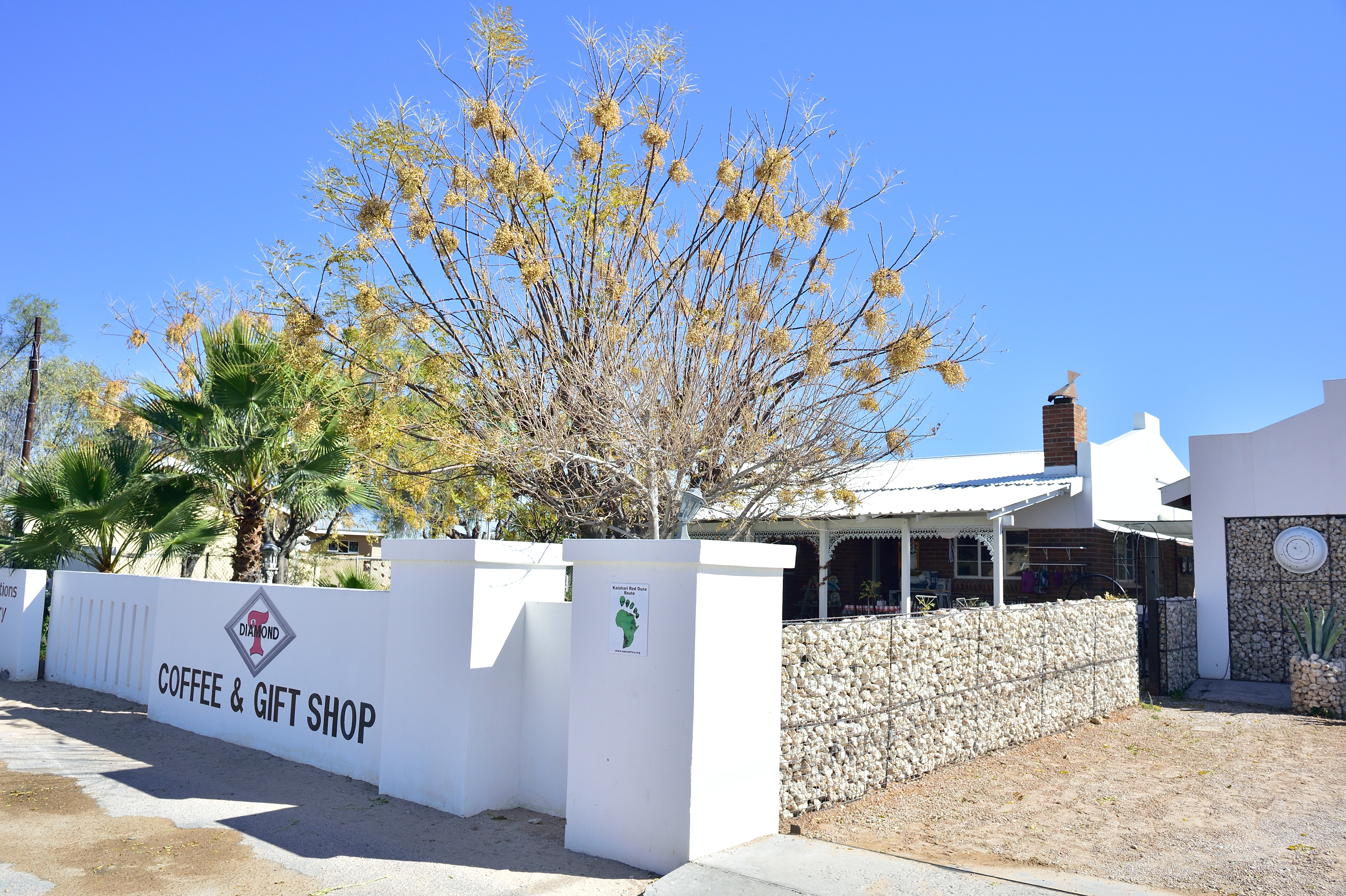
- Local coffee shop

- Location within Northern Cape Location within South Africa Location within Africa
- Coordinates: 26°58′54″S 20°46′51″E
- Country: South Africa
- Province: Northern Cape
- District: ZF Mgcawu
- Municipality: Dawid Kruiper

Area
  - Total: 3.11 km^{2} (1.20 sq mi)
- Time zone: UTC+2 (SAST)
- Postal code (street): 8814
- PO box: 8814
- Area code: 054

Askham is a village in the Dawid Kruiper Local Municipality in the ZF Mgcawu District Municipality in the Northern Cape province of South Africa. Askham lies not far from the confluence of the mostly dry Molopo and Kuruman Rivers in the Red Kalahari Desert, about 200 km north of Upington at the junction of the R31 and the R360 roads.

The village is located in the belt of the irrigated green land that surrounds the Orange River, as it flows North-West through the Kalahari toward the Namibian border and the Richtersveld area of Namaqualand. Askham is located in the southern Kalahari wilderness area on the Red Dune Route, where the dunes grow approximately 35m in height. The area was once home to the San Bushmen, Koranna and Nama people.

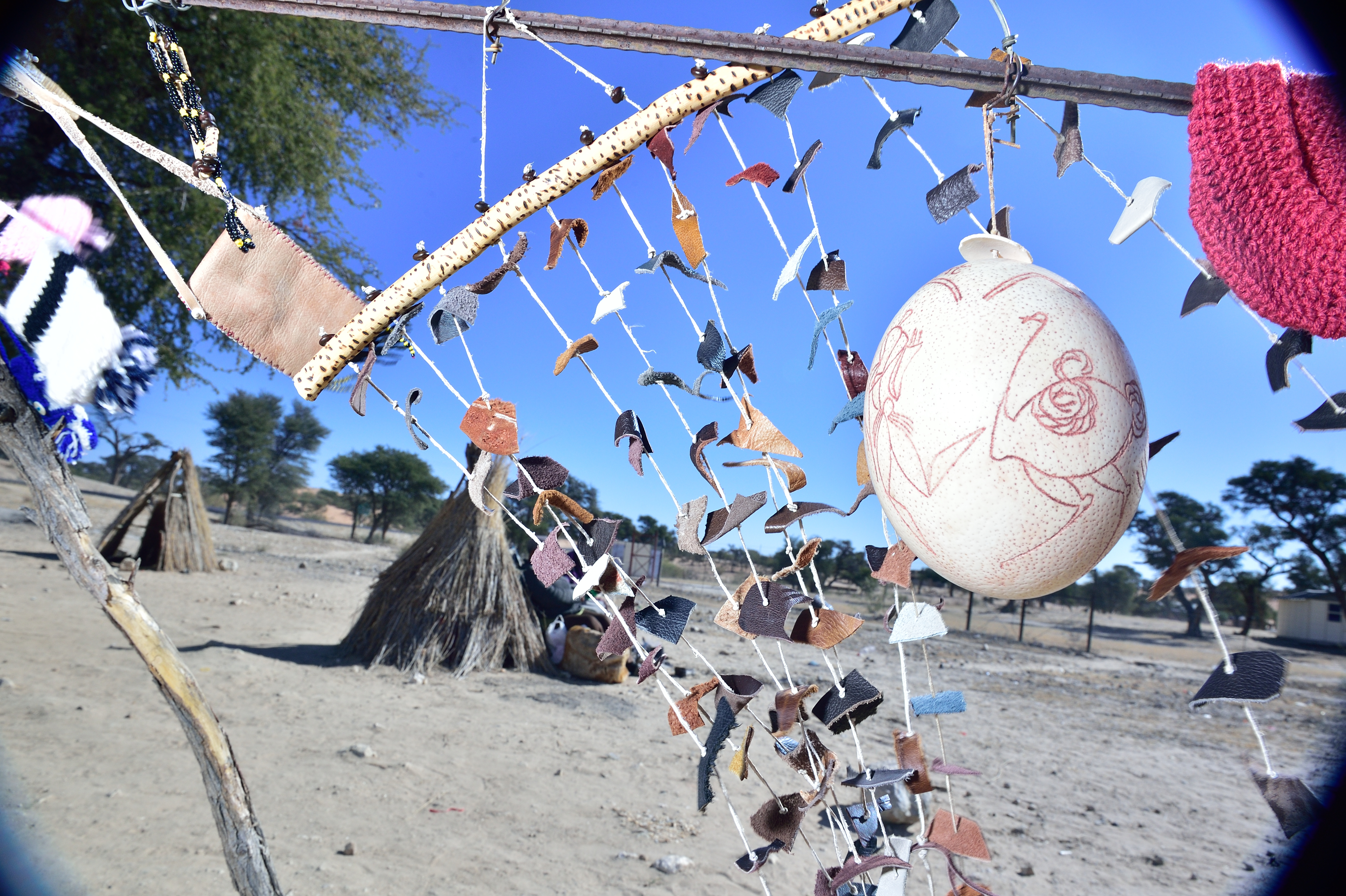
Traditional art

== History ==
The settlement of Askham developed around a school boarding house, built in 1931, and the Dutch Reformed Church of Askam, which serves the entire Kalahari region. Scottish land surveyor, Roger Jackson, gave Askham its name when he surveyed farms in the Kuruman river in 1919. There are numerous varying explanations given for Roger Jackson’s choice in naming the settlement ‘Askham’. It is believed that Jackson named the town after a town on the Irish coast. Many others believe that Jackson derived the name from a farmer’s words: “Ask him”, or from the message he sent to request ingredients for his breakfast: “Ask ham!”. There is no general consensus on the choice of naming the village. The police station was built in 1931 and was a breeding station for camels used for police patrols in the Kalahari. At one stage, the police station kept over 400 camels and supplied them to police stations in Rietfontein, Obobogorag, Kuruman, Van Zylsrus, Deben and Olifantshoek.

== Attractions ==
Askham provides activities such as dune boarding, guided walks, game drives and bird exhibitions.

=== Kalahari Red Dune Route ===
The village of Askham is the starting point of the Kalahari Red Dune. The Route is home to the ancient tribes Khoi and San. Their descendants can be found today producing and selling authentic handicrafts such as bow and arrows, beads made out of ostrich egg shells and animal skin bags.

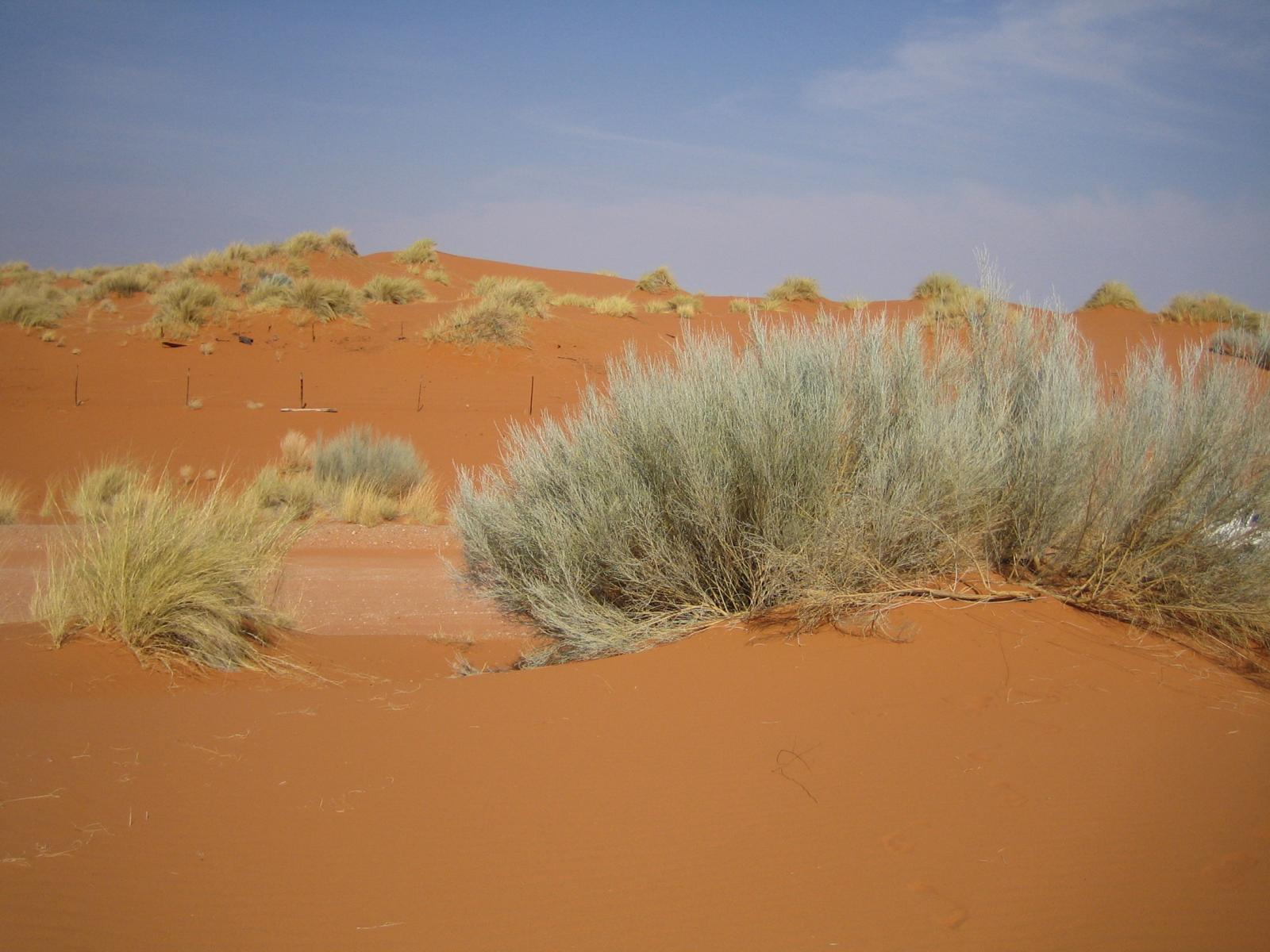
Red Dunes in the Kalahari, Northern Cape

=== San Info Centre ===
The San Info Centre is an information centre located in Askham and constitutes the western point of the Footprints of the San Route, connecting the San community in Kimberley to the small community in Andriesville. Made of wooden buildings, the tourism information centre also offers San cultural tours and guided walks with San trackers.

=== Kalahari Desert Festival ===
The Kalahari Desert festival is located at the //Uruke bush camp on the farm Witdraai, just outside Askham. The first Festival happened in March 2013 and is now an annual event at the Northern Cape festivals calendar. Local guides from the Askham village host guests with storytelling sessions, gathering medicinal plants and teaching traditional skills such as archery and arts and crafts. The festival celebrates the indigenous cultures of the Kalahari communities in Southern Africa and is organised by the South African San Institute in collaboration with the ≠Khomani San, the Department of Economic Development and Tourism, the Department of Sports, Arts and Culture and the Northern Cape Province.

== See also ==
- Rieldans
