= R325 (South Africa) =

Regional route in South Africa

Regional route R325
- R325 route map

Route information
- Length: 121 km (75 mi)

Major junctions
- South end: N8 in Griekwastad
- R309 near Postmasburg; R385 in Postmasburg
- North end: N14 near Kathu

Location
- Country: South Africa

Highway system
- Numbered routes of South Africa
← R324	→ R326

The R325 is a Regional Route in South Africa that connects Griquatown with Kathu via Postmasburg.

== Route ==
The R325 begins in Griekwastad at a junction with the N8 national route. It heads northwards for 70 kilometres to the town of Postmasburg, where it meets the R385 route. It continues northwards for 54 kilometres to end at a junction with the N14 national route approximately 25 kilometres south of Kathu (22 kilometres east of Olifantshoek).
