= C17 road (Namibia) =

Secondary route in Namibia

C17 road

Major junctions
- South end: C16 near the B1 / C16 junction at Keetmanshoop
- C11 at Koës
- North end: C15 between Mata Mata and Gochas

Location
- Country: Namibia

Highway system
- Transport in Namibia
← C16	→ C18

The C17 is an untarred road in the eastern part of the ǁKaras Region in southern Namibia. It branches off the C15 between Gochas and Mata Mata, a couple of kilometers inside of Hardap Region, passes Koës, and ends about 190 kilometres (120 mi) to the south-west in Keetmanshoop. It is a road mainly used by tourists and local farmers and might become impassable in good rainy seasons.
