= Aroab =

Village in the ǁKaras Region of Namibia

- Village
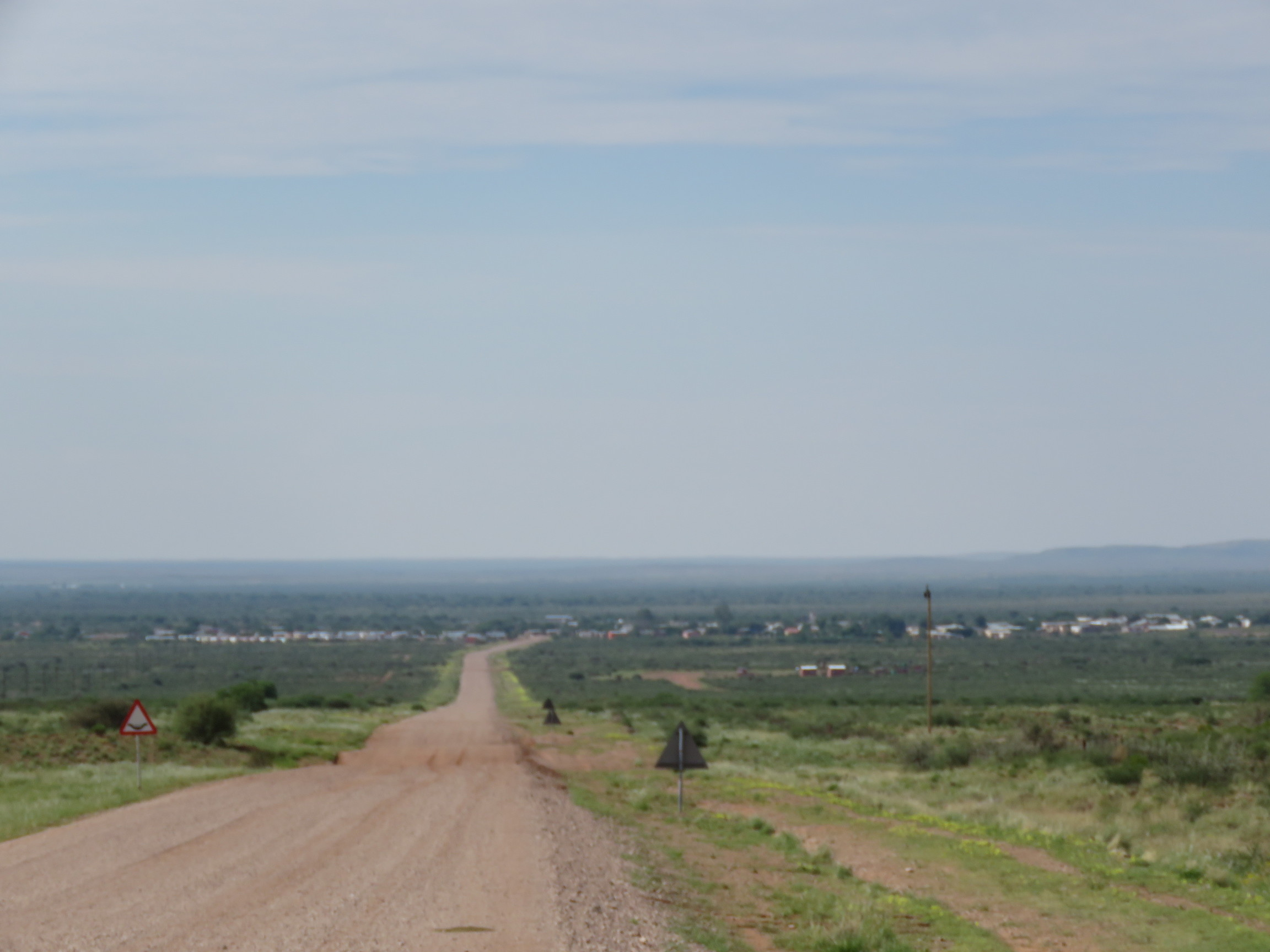
- Skyline image of Aroab

- Location in Namibia
- Coordinates: 26°48′S 19°39′E
- Country: Namibia
- Region: ǁKaras Region
- Constituency: Keetmanshoop Rural

Government
  - CEO: Elsa Laubscher

Population (2023)
  - Total: 2,651
- Time zone: UTC+2 (SAST)

Aroab is a village in the Keetmanshoop Rural Constituency of ǁKaras Region in southern Namibia. It had 2,651 inhabitants in 2023.

== Geography ==
Aroab is situated about 170 kilometres (110 mi) south-east of Keetmanshoop on the edge of the Kalahari desert; the average annual rainfall is about 150–200 mm. Aroab is the district centre of the Keetmanshoop Rural electoral constituency.

Historical population
Year	Pop.	±% p.a.
2011	1,660	—
2023	2,651	+3.98%

== Origin ==
In 1900 Misters Blaauw and Oppermann, supposedly of German descent, traded Aroab and the surrounding area from an indigenous Nama tribe for sheep and rifles. A quarrel about a ground dam resulted in the two gentlemen splitting the land in two - Aroab and Streitdamm, the ranch adjoining Aroab to the west.

== Economy and infrastructure ==
The vast majority of income is generated on ranches in the surrounding area and stem from sheep, goat and cattle ranching for meat production purposes. The most common sheep breed ranched with is the Dorper, with Persian, Damara, Van Rooy, Karakul and others to a lesser extent. Popular cattle breeds for this area are Nguni, Bonsmara, Brahman and various others to a lesser extent. Various sheep, cattle and goat stud breeders are registered in the area.

During the months of May - Aug (winter) meat hunting takes place widely. Huntable species are Oryx (gemsbok), Springbok and Kudu. To a lesser extent trophy hunting is also available.

Aroab is only reachable via gravel road - the C16 170 km from Keetmanshoop and 35 km from the Klein Menasse / Rietfontein borderpost, the C11 182 km from Karasburg and 142 km from Koës. An unmanned gravel landing strip for light aircraft is situated northwest of the village.

Aroab has surprisingly many schools for such a small place. There are government primary schools (grades 1-7), a Roman Catholic school, a government senior secondary school (grades 8-12) and a private school. There is also a Roman Catholic clinic that provides basic medical services, a post office, Police station, Village Council, a library and various churches (among others Dutch Reformed & Roman Catholic). Other businesses include a farmer's cooperative, general dealer, windpump repairs & engineering and a small abattoir and butchery.

Although plagued by a high unemployment rate, Aroab is well-developed compared to other places in Namibia's south. The village is completely electrified, has no shacks, and all 500 households are connected to the water and sewerage system. The village further operates a public pool.

== Politics ==
Aroab is governed by a village council that currently has five seats. Aroab was proclaimed a village after the 1992 Namibian local and regional elections. The first election that determined a village council for Aroab, at that time with seven seats, was the 1998 local authority elections. The Democratic Turnhalle Alliance (DTA) won this election with 211 votes. It gained four seats. SWAPO, the most successful party in all elections countrywide, came second with 137 votes and three seats.

In the 2004 local authority elections the DTA narrowly won the village council election again with 276 votes. Village councils had by then be reduced to five seats. DTA gained two seats, as did the Congress of Democrats (CoD, 242 votes). SWAPO came third with 185 votes and one seat. The DTA also won the 2010 local authority election with 260 votes. SWAPO finished in 2nd place with 211 votes, followed by the Rally for Democracy and Progress (RDP, an opposition party founded in 2007, 112 votes) and the CoD with 40 votes. The 2015 local authority election was narrowly won by SWAPO party which gained two seats (267 votes). The DTA finished second and also gained two seats (216 votes), and the remaining seat went to the RDP with 86 votes.

In the 2020 local authority election "serious procedural errors" were discovered for the Aroab village council. Some voters had been handed ballot papers meant for Keetmanshoop. No initial result were announced, and the electoral court ordered a re-run. The re-run was conducted on 26 February 2021 and won by the newly formed Landless People's Movement (LPM). LPM gained 293 votes and two seats in the village council, followed by SWAPO with two seats (236 votes). The Popular Democratic Movement (PDM, the new name of the DTA) obtained the remaining seat with 132 votes.

Willem Appollus, an Aroab native, represented Keetmanshoop Rural in the ǁKaras Regional Council and the National Council of Namibia from 2004 to 2010. He also served on the Aroab Local Authority from 1998 to 2004.
