= Gamagara Local Municipality elections =

South African Municipal election

The Gamagara Local Municipality council consists of fifteen members elected by mixed-member proportional representation. Eight councillors are elected by first-past-the-post voting in eight wards, while the remaining seven are chosen from party lists so that the total number of party representatives is proportional to the number of votes received. In the election of 1 November 2021 the African National Congress (ANC) lost its majority, but remained the largest party, with seven seats.

== Results ==
The following table shows the composition of the council after past elections.

| Event | ANC | DA | EFF | Other | Total |
|---|---|---|---|---|---|
| 2006 election | 6 | 1 | — | 1 | 8 |
| 2011 election | 6 | 3 | — | 1 | 10 |
| 2016 election | 7 | 5 | 1 | 0 | 13 |
| 2021 election | 7 | 5 | 1 | 2 | 15 |

== March 2006 election ==
The following table shows the results of the 2006 election.

| Party | Ward | | | List | | | Total seats |
| Party | Votes | % | Seats | Votes | % | Seats | Total seats |
|---|---|---|---|---|---|---|---|
| African National Congress | 4,803 | 69.34 | 3 | 4,770 | 69.10 | 3 | 6 |
| Democratic Alliance | 1,069 | 15.43 | 1 | 1,056 | 15.30 | 0 | 1 |
| Independent Democrats | 773 | 11.16 | 0 | 767 | 11.11 | 1 | 1 |
| Freedom Front Plus | 170 | 2.45 | 0 | 186 | 2.69 | 0 | 0 |
| African Christian Democratic Party | 112 | 1.62 | 0 | 124 | 1.80 | 0 | 0 |
| Total | 6,927 | 100.00 | 4 | 6,903 | 100.00 | 4 | 8 |
| Valid votes | 6,927 | 98.55 | | 6,903 | 98.52 | | |
| Invalid/blank votes | 102 | 1.45 | | 104 | 1.48 | | |
| Total votes | 7,029 | 100.00 | | 7,007 | 100.00 | | |
| Registered voters/turnout | 14,666 | 47.93 | | 14,666 | 47.78 | | |

== May 2011 election ==
The following table shows the results of the 2011 election.

| Party | Ward | | | List | | | Total seats |
| Party | Votes | % | Seats | Votes | % | Seats | Total seats |
|---|---|---|---|---|---|---|---|
| African National Congress | 5,734 | 63.09 | 4 | 5,704 | 63.72 | 2 | 6 |
| Democratic Alliance | 2,653 | 29.19 | 1 | 2,636 | 29.45 | 2 | 3 |
| Congress of the People | 701 | 7.71 | 0 | 611 | 6.83 | 1 | 1 |
| Total | 9,088 | 100.00 | 5 | 8,951 | 100.00 | 5 | 10 |
| Valid votes | 9,088 | 98.27 | | 8,951 | 98.66 | | |
| Invalid/blank votes | 160 | 1.73 | | 122 | 1.34 | | |
| Total votes | 9,248 | 100.00 | | 9,073 | 100.00 | | |
| Registered voters/turnout | 16,933 | 54.62 | | 16,933 | 53.58 | | |

== August 2016 election ==
The following table shows the results of the 2016 election.

| Party | Ward | | | List | | | Total seats |
| Party | Votes | % | Seats | Votes | % | Seats | Total seats |
|---|---|---|---|---|---|---|---|
| African National Congress | 5,736 | 47.15 | 4 | 6,035 | 50.24 | 3 | 7 |
| Democratic Alliance | 4,103 | 33.73 | 3 | 4,608 | 38.36 | 2 | 5 |
| Economic Freedom Fighters | 709 | 5.83 | 0 | 724 | 6.03 | 1 | 1 |
| Independent candidates | 1,164 | 9.57 | 0 | | | | 0 |
| Freedom Front Plus | 273 | 2.24 | 0 | 311 | 2.59 | 0 | 0 |
| Gamagara Community Forum | 116 | 0.95 | 0 | 198 | 1.65 | 0 | 0 |
| Congress of the People | 65 | 0.53 | 0 | 137 | 1.14 | 0 | 0 |
| Total | 12,166 | 100.00 | 7 | 12,013 | 100.00 | 6 | 13 |
| Valid votes | 12,166 | 96.99 | | 12,013 | 96.50 | | |
| Invalid/blank votes | 378 | 3.01 | | 436 | 3.50 | | |
| Total votes | 12,544 | 100.00 | | 12,449 | 100.00 | | |
| Registered voters/turnout | 21,862 | 57.38 | | 21,862 | 56.94 | | |

== November 2021 election ==
The following table shows the results of the 2021 election.

| Party | Ward | | | List | | | Total seats |
| Party | Votes | % | Seats | Votes | % | Seats | Total seats |
|---|---|---|---|---|---|---|---|
| African National Congress | 4,973 | 43.07 | 6 | 4,961 | 43.06 | 1 | 7 |
| Democratic Alliance | 3,931 | 34.04 | 2 | 4,005 | 34.76 | 3 | 5 |
| Gamagara Community Forum | 1,556 | 13.48 | 0 | 1,503 | 13.05 | 2 | 2 |
| Economic Freedom Fighters | 861 | 7.46 | 0 | 798 | 6.93 | 1 | 1 |
| Freedom Front Plus | 220 | 1.91 | 0 | 218 | 1.89 | 0 | 0 |
| South African Royal Kingdoms Organization | 6 | 0.05 | 0 | 36 | 0.31 | 0 | 0 |
| Total | 11,547 | 100.00 | 8 | 11,521 | 100.00 | 7 | 15 |
| Valid votes | 11,547 | 98.75 | | 11,521 | 98.71 | | |
| Invalid/blank votes | 146 | 1.25 | | 151 | 1.29 | | |
| Total votes | 11,693 | 100.00 | | 11,672 | 100.00 | | |
| Registered voters/turnout | 23,135 | 50.54 | | 23,135 | 50.45 | | |
