= R372 (South Africa) =

Regional route in South Africa

Regional route R372
- R372 route map

Location
- Country: South Africa

Highway system
- Numbered routes of South Africa
← R371	→ R374

The R372 is a Regional Route in South Africa that connects Kuruman to Taung via Reivilo.

Its western origin is the R31, south of Kuruman. It heads east to the R371. The routes are co-signed heading north to Reivilo. From there, the R372 diverges, again heading east. It crosses the N18 ending just afterwards in Taung.
