= C15 road (Namibia) =

Secondary route in Namibia

C15 road

Major junctions
- South end: R360 at the South African border at Mata Mata (Kgalagadi Transfrontier Park)
- C17 between Mata Mata and Gochas; C18 at Gochas; C20 at Stampriet; C21 at Hoachanas; C25 at Uhlenhorst
- North end: C23 at Dordabis

Location
- Country: Namibia

Highway system
- Transport in Namibia
← C14	→ C16

C15 is an untarred road in eastern Namibia travelling 448 kilometres (278 mi) through the Khomas, Hardap, and ǁKaras Regions. It starts in Dordabis and ends at the Mata Mata border post, leading into South Africa.

A feasibility study about upgrading the road to bitumen between Stampriet and Mata Mata was planned for the 2020/2021 financial year.
