= Askham =

Askham could refer to:

in England

- Askham, Cumbria
- Askham, Nottinghamshire
- Askham Bryan, York
- Askham Richard, York

in South Africa

- Askham, Northern Cape

== See also ==
- Askam and Ireleth, Cumbria, England
