= R385 (South Africa) =

Regional route in South Africa

Regional route R385
- R385 route map

Route information
- Length: 280 km (170 mi)

Major junctions
- Northwest end: N14 near Olifantshoek
- R325 in Postmasburg; R31 near Lime Acres; N8 in Campbell; R370 near Douglas; R357 in Douglas
- Southeast end: N12 in Hopetown

Location
- Country: South Africa

Highway system
- Numbered routes of South Africa
← R384	→ R386

The R385 is a regional route in South Africa that connects Olifantshoek with Hopetown via Postmasburg and Douglas.

== Route ==
The R385 begins south of Olifantshoek, at a junction with the N14 national route. It begins by going south-east for 54 kilometres to the town of Postmasburg, where it intersects with the R325 road. It continues eastwards for 50 kilometres to meet the R31 road north of Lime Acres. At this junction, the R385 turns southwards and proceeds to enter Lime Acres.

From Lime Acres, the R385 continues southwards for 63 kilometres to meet the N8 national route at Campbell. It proceeds southwards for 28 kilometres to meet the southern terminus of the R370 road and cross the Vaal River to enter the town of Douglas as Bowker Street.

In Douglas Central, the R385 reaches a junction with the R357 road (Roper Street; Loch Street) and becomes co-signed with it eastwards for 3.5 kilometres before the R357 becomes its own road north-east while the R385 turns to the south-east. The R385 continues south-east, following the Orange River, for 69 kilometres to reach its end at a junction with the N12 national route just north of Hopetown.
