= C18 road (Namibia) =

Secondary route in Namibia

C18 road

Major junctions
- West end: B1 near Gibeon
- East end: C15 at Gochas

Location
- Country: Namibia

Highway system
- Transport in Namibia
| ← C17 | → C19 |

C18 is an untarred road in the Hardap Region of central Namibia. It branches off the C15 at Gochas and ends 118 kilometres (73 mi) to the east at the B1. The town of Gibeon and the Fish River can then be accessed by driving 9 kilometres (5.6 mi) down the D1089.
