= C11 road (Namibia) =

Secondary route in Namibia

C11 road

Major junctions
- South end: B3 at Karasburg
- C16 at Aroab
- North end: C17 at Koës

Location
- Country: Namibia

Highway system
- Transport in Namibia
← C10	→ C12

The C11 is an untarred highway in southern Namibia. It starts branching off the C17 road at Koës, connects Aroab, and finishes 319 kilometres (198 mi) later when it reaches the B3 road, two kilometres (1.2 mi) from Karasburg. The section between Karasburg and Aroab was also known as MR 25.
