= Joe Morolong Local Municipality elections =

The Joe Morolong Local Municipality council consists of twenty-nine members elected by mixed-member proportional representation. Fifteen councillors are elected by first-past-the-post voting in fifteen wards, while the remaining fourteen are chosen from party lists so that the total number of party representatives is proportional to the number of votes received. In the election of 1 November 2021 the African National Congress (ANC) won a majority of eighteen seats.

== Results ==
The following table shows the composition of the council after past elections.

Event	ANC	DA	EFF	UCDP	Other	Total
2006 election	17	—	—	4	0	21
2011 election	23	1	—	2	3	29
2016 election	21	1	6	1	0	29
2021 election	18	1	8	0	2	29

== March 2006 election ==
The following table shows the results of the 2006 election.

Party	Ward			List			Total seats
Party	Votes	%	Seats	Votes	%	Seats	Total seats
African National Congress	17,326	79.45	11	17,733	81.95	6	17
United Christian Democratic Party	3,327	15.26	0	3,906	18.05	4	4
Independent candidates	852	3.91	0				0
African Christian Democratic Party	303	1.39	0				0
Total	21,808	100.00	11	21,639	100.00	10	21
Valid votes	21,808	96.58		21,639	95.60		
Invalid/blank votes	772	3.42		995	4.40		
Total votes	22,580	100.00		22,634	100.00		
Registered voters/turnout	42,612	52.99		42,612	53.12		

== May 2011 election ==
The following table shows the results of the 2011 election.

Party	Ward			List			Total seats
Party	Votes	%	Seats	Votes	%	Seats	Total seats
African National Congress	20,841	76.07	15	21,798	80.25	8	23
Congress of the People	2,212	8.07	0	2,157	7.94	3	3
United Christian Democratic Party	1,600	5.84	0	1,586	5.84	2	2
Democratic Alliance	1,138	4.15	0	1,316	4.85	1	1
Independent candidates	1,400	5.11	0				0
African People's Convention	207	0.76	0	304	1.12	0	0
Total	27,398	100.00	15	27,161	100.00	14	29
Valid votes	27,398	96.47		27,161	95.91		
Invalid/blank votes	1,004	3.53		1,157	4.09		
Total votes	28,402	100.00		28,318	100.00		
Registered voters/turnout	49,517	57.36		49,517	57.19		

== August 2016 election ==
The following table shows the results of the 2016 election.

Party	Ward			List			Total seats
Party	Votes	%	Seats	Votes	%	Seats	Total seats
African National Congress	19,418	70.24	15	19,712	71.21	6	21
Economic Freedom Fighters	5,311	19.21	0	5,682	20.53	6	6
Democratic Alliance	991	3.58	0	944	3.41	1	1
United Christian Democratic Party	652	2.36	0	703	2.54	1	1
Congress of the People	456	1.65	0	642	2.32	0	0
Independent candidates	816	2.95	0				0
Total	27,644	100.00	15	27,683	100.00	14	29
Valid votes	27,644	97.41		27,683	97.51		
Invalid/blank votes	735	2.59		707	2.49		
Total votes	28,379	100.00		28,390	100.00		
Registered voters/turnout	51,911	54.67		51,911	54.69		

== November 2021 election ==
The following table shows the results of the 2021 election.

Party	Ward			List			Total seats
Party	Votes	%	Seats	Votes	%	Seats	Total seats
African National Congress	14,419	58.79	13	15,174	61.62	5	18
Economic Freedom Fighters	6,754	27.54	2	6,817	27.68	6	8
Democratic Alliance	770	3.14	0	793	3.22	1	1
Independent candidates	1,313	5.35	0				0
Forum for Service Delivery	464	1.89	0	746	3.03	1	1
South African Royal Kingdoms Organization	341	1.39	0	415	1.69	1	1
United Christian Democratic Party	255	1.04	0	448	1.82	0	0
Freedom Front Plus	211	0.86	0	232	0.94	0	0
Total	24,527	100.00	15	24,625	100.00	14	29
Valid votes	24,527	96.62		24,625	96.64		
Invalid/blank votes	859	3.38		857	3.36		
Total votes	25,386	100.00		25,482	100.00		
Registered voters/turnout	49,979	50.79		49,979	50.99		

=== By-elections from November 2021 ===
The following by-elections were held to fill vacant ward seats in the period from the election in November 2021.

Date	Ward	Party of the previous councillor	Party of the newly elected councillor
19 Mar 2025	1	African National Congress	African National Congress
