= R371 road =

R371 road may refer to:

- R371 road (Ireland)
- R371 road (South Africa)
