= C16 road (Namibia) =

Secondary route in Namibia

C16 road

Major junctions
- West end: B1 at Keetmanshoop
- C17 near Keetmanshoop; C11 at Aroab
- East end: R31 at the South African border near Rietfontein

Location
- Country: Namibia

Highway system
- Transport in Namibia
← C15	→ C17

The C16 is an untarred road in the ǁKaras Region of southern Namibia. It starts in Keetmanshoop and leads via Aroab (163 kilometres (101 mi) away) to the Klein Menasse border post with South Africa. The border post on the South African side is Rietfontein. In the raining season the C16 regularly deteriorates and becomes passable only with 4x4.
