= Kathu Forest =

Protected area in South Africa

- Khathu Forest Nature Reserve
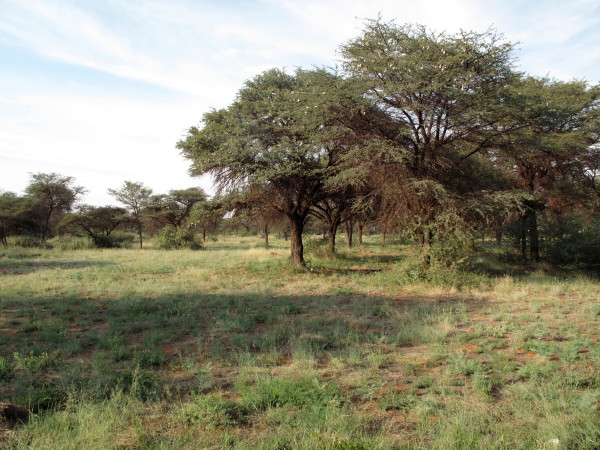
- Interactive map of Kathu Forest
- Location: Kathu, Northern Cape Province, South Africa
- Coordinates: 27°37′38.96″S 23°2′57.84″E
- Area: 6.57 km^{2} (2.54 sq mi)
- Designation: Forest nature reserve
- Designated: 2018

Kathu Forest is an area of protected woodland in the Northern Cape province of South Africa. It is some 4000 hectares in extent and was proclaimed in an attempt to safeguard an unusually dense concentration of camel thorn trees (Vachellia erioloba).

The area was proclaimed a State Forest in 1919, but was deproclaimed in 1956 and later registered as a Natural Heritage Site in 1995. In 2009 it was declared a Protected Woodland, and re-declared in 2013 in order to expand and re-demarcate the area. It used to harbour a moderate to high diversity of wildlife, including Red Data, endemic and protected species.

== Failing health ==
As far back as 1991 it was noticed that trees were suffering a decline in health and tree population demographics were changing. Trees were showing deformities in leaf and pod shape, were stunted, and were covered in red dust originating from the iron ore mine of Sishen. A research worker from the University of the Free State investigated the role of three factors in the decline - mining operations, land use that entailed overgrazing, and the possibility of some natural process occurring by which the trees were reaching the end of their life cycle.

=== Open pit mining, dust and groundwater ===
Open cast mining is often accompanied by large-scale pumping of water coming from a shallow water table. In the Kathu region underground water is compartmentalised by dolerite dykes serving as natural barriers to lateral water flow. Current mining operations affect the water levels in three of these 'water compartments', but do not appear to have any appreciable effect on levels in adjacent compartments.

Mining operations have denuded some 15 square kilometres of surface, and this, together with the dust raised by excavation, caused all trees on the north-western side of the mine to be covered in thick, red dust. However, trees that are not downwind of the mine are also dying, so that dust pollution, although undoubtedly contributing to the demise, is just one of the factors to be considered.

=== Grazing ===
Overstocking and consequent overgrazing of the area by livestock, certainly aggravate the decline of Vachellia erioloba. Pods are eaten or collected for fodder while seedlings and young trees are browsed to ground level by sheep, goats, cattle and game, severely affecting regeneration; as a result very few seedlings mature.

Farmers often cut camel thorn trees on their land in the mistaken belief it will lead to an improvement in the veld's quality and grazing capacity, whereas the trees produce abundant foliage and pods, even in times of drought, and are sought after by stock. Trees produce shade that reduces soil temperatures and evaporation, while the decomposition of pods and foliage produces soil rich in nutrients. Pods collected by farmers to feed stock confined to kraals results in a decrease in seedlings and regeneration.

The effects of poisoning encroaching Rhigozum trichotomum and Acacia mellifera as well as clearing road reserves, invariably results in collateral damage through the death of non-target species.

=== Timber exploited for fuel ===
There is a thriving market for camel thorn wood in South Africa despite legislation against this practice. Large volumes of wood are trucked to the metropolitan areas and used for barbecues in the suburbs.
