= Hotazel =

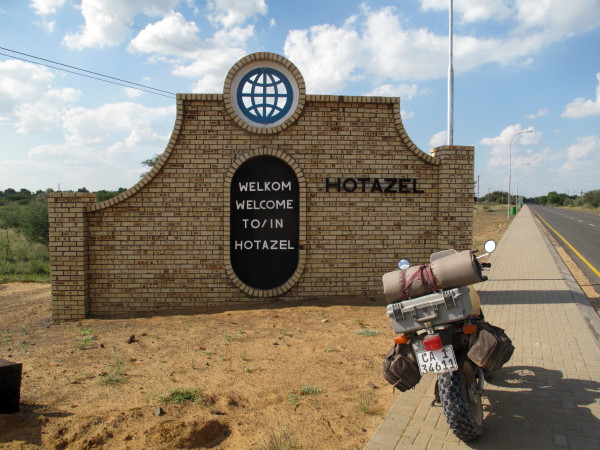
- Hotazel gate

- Location within Northern Cape Location within South Africa
- Coordinates: 27°12′S 22°57′E
- Country: South Africa
- Province: Northern Cape
- District: John Taolo Gaetsewe
- Municipality: Joe Morolong

Area
  - Total: 20.08 km^{2} (7.75 sq mi)

Population (2011)
  - Total: 1,756
  - Density: 87.45/km^{2} (226.5/sq mi)

Racial makeup (2011)
  - Black African: 61.8%
  - Coloured: 14.6%
  - Indian/Asian: 0.9%
  - White: 22.6%
  - Other: 0.2%

First languages (2011)
  - Tswana: 48.8%
  - Afrikaans: 37.9%
  - English: 5.0%
  - Sotho: 2.8%
  - Other: 5.6%
- Time zone: UTC+2 (SAST)
- Postal code (street): 8490
- PO box: 8490
- Area code: 053

Hotazel is a town in John Taolo Gaetsewe District Municipality in the Northern Cape province of South Africa.

The town serves the manganese mines, 147 km (91 mi) north of Postmasburg and 46 km (28.6 mi) north-west of Kuruman. It takes its name from the farm on which it was laid out; a pun on 'hot as hell', referring to the weather when the farm was surveyed and the generally torrid climate surrounding the area.
