= Hartenbos =

Town in Western Cape, South Africa

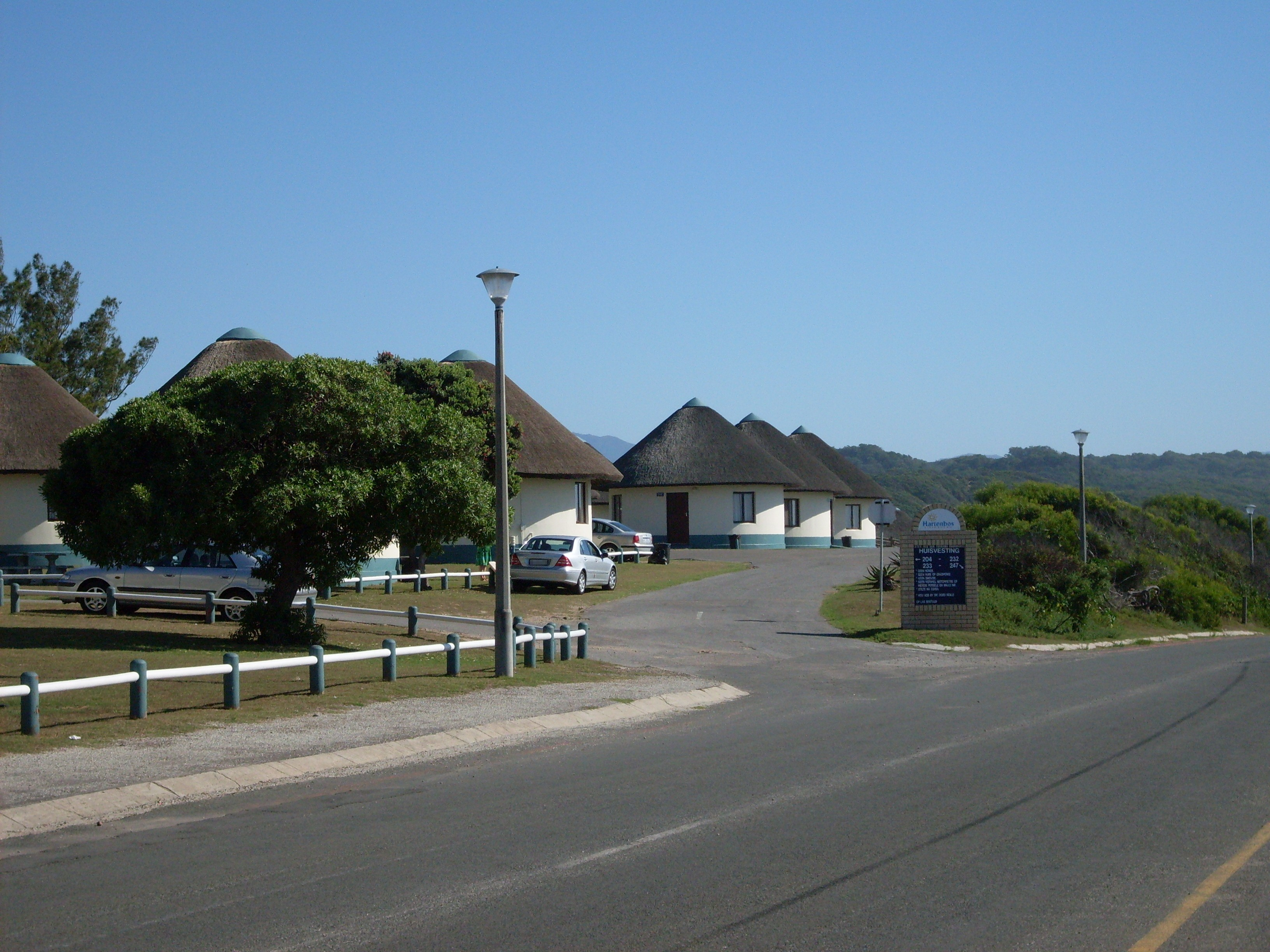
- ATKV in Hartenbos

- Location within Western Cape Location within South Africa Location within Africa
- Coordinates: 34°7′S 22°7′E
- Country: South Africa
- Province: Western Cape
- District: Garden Route
- Municipality: Mossel Bay

Area
  - Total: 24.20 km^{2} (9.34 sq mi)

Population (2011)
  - Total: 4,196
  - Density: 173.4/km^{2} (449.1/sq mi)

Racial makeup (2011)
  - Black African: 9.9%
  - Coloured: 17.5%
  - Indian/Asian: 0.5%
  - White: 71.5%
  - Other: 0.6%

First languages (2011)
  - Afrikaans: 93.4%
  - English: 4.3%
  - Other: 2.3%
- Time zone: UTC+2 (SAST)
- Postal code (street): 6520
- PO box: 6520
- Area code: 044

Hartenbos is a town in the Western Cape province of South Africa. It is located some 45 kilometres outside George, South Africa. It belongs, together with 20 other settlements, to the Mossel Bay Local Municipality. Originally a farm, the South African Railways and Harbours turned it into a holiday resort for their lower-rung employees in 1933.

== Population ==
The 2001 census showed a population of 71,494 for the whole municipality. The official estimate of 2005 regards 99,676 as a proper figure for an increased population. Although no official figures have been made available, it is estimated that around 15% of these figures relate to the current population of Hartenbos.

== History ==
In 1936 the Afrikaanse Taal en Kultuurvereniging (ATKV, and "Afrikaans Language and Cultural Society" in English) purchased the farm for 7000 pounds, divided it into 670 lots which sold for about 60 pounds each. The resort was expanded over the years, and several lots were hired out permanently on condition that no permanent brick structures were built on them; not until 1994 were people allowed to purchase these lots.

== Facilities ==
The ATKV also has an amphitheater in the resort and holds Afrikaans cultural festivals, such as their 2005 Afrikiti concerts there. On Christmas morning, the Kersdiens is attended by thousands in this arena. Several other services, such as the Kerssangdiens (Christmas Carol Ceremony) and Middernagdiens (New Year Church Service) are held in the festive season. During this peak holiday season Hartenbos accommodates up to 15 000 visitors at a time.

The resort includes five kilometers of Blue Flag Beaches, a river with paddle boats, a super tube, fun park, heated swimming pool, flea markets, conference facilities and shopping centres. The resort is the largest self-catering establishment on the Western Cape's Garden Route coast. Hartenbos has its own primary school, sport clubs and several churches.

== Cultural significance ==
Hartenbos is embedded into the Afrikaner cultural thinking. Koos Kombuis, a rebel against apartheid and member of the Voëlvry movement which kickstarted Afrikaans rock and roll, writes of the 'pure zen' of this town: "As a child, Hartenbos symbolised to me everything that is positive, beautiful and noble about humanity. The fact that my parents could not afford anything better than a very small asbestos home right next to the railway line did not bother me...with the years Hartenbos has not changed much...even though the seafront restaurant is now licensed [to sell liquor] the ooms and tannies (not just their children) still drink pink milkshakes after Sunday lunch. On the dirt roads of Hartenbos, the play of growing up is performed every season... But Hartenbos is not white anymore. Afrikaans, yes, but indeed multi-racial... How did the ATKV manage that? They did nothing. It just happened. Virtually overnight... It's high time the whole of South Africa learns the pure zen of Hartenbos."

== Modern ==
There are radical changes and developments re-shaping the face of the municipality. Some of these new developments around the holiday area of the town have met with severe resistance from many locals, citing that the character of the town will be destroyed by these developments. Especially controversial are proposals to turn certain caravan parks into conference venues to ensure a constant market of tourists. To many people, however, these parks are the soul of the town. At the current stage, all talk of such development has ceased. It seems as though the town will remain as it is for some time to come.

== Bibliography ==
- Tourist's Guide to Greater Mossel Bay (Compiled by Marie Sweetnam), vol. 1; Oct. 1997
- Kombuis, Koos: "Afrikaans my darling", Human & Rousseau (2003)
