= R360 (South Africa) =

Regional route in South Africa

Regional route R360
- R360 route map

Route information
- Maintained by NCDRPW and SANRAL
- Length: 361 km (224 mi)

Major junctions
- South end: N10 in Upington
- R31 in Askham; R31 in Andriesvale
- North end: C15 at the Mata-Mata border with Namibia

Location
- Country: South Africa

Highway system
- Numbered routes of South Africa
| ← R359 | → R361 |

The R360 is a Regional Route in the Northern Cape of South Africa that connects Upington with the Kalahari Gemsbok National Park (part of the Kgalagadi Transfrontier Park) and the Namibian border. It passes through Askham and Andriesvale.

== Route ==
Its southern origin is a junction with the N10 at Upington (north of the city centre), just west of the Upington Airport. From there, it heads north-west for 150 kilometres until it meets the R31 in the town of Askham. The two roads join and are co-signed for about 13 kilometres westwards, following the Kuruman River, up to the village of Andriesvale.

At Andriesvale, they cross the Molopo River (adjacent to its confluence with the Kuruman River) before splitting at a junction, where the R31 remains on the westerly road and the R360 becomes the road northwards. The R360 runs for 60 kilometres, bypassing the Gemsbok Border with Botswana and heading north along the western banks of the Nossob River, to reach the entrance to the Kgalagadi Transfrontier Park at Twee Rivieren Rest Camp. It heads north-west through the park along the Auob River's western banks to the Mata Mata Rest Camp. It then crosses the border into Namibia, where it continues as the C15.
