= R374 (South Africa) =

Regional route in South Africa

Regional route R374
- R374 route map

Location
- Country: South Africa

Highway system
- Numbered routes of South Africa
← R372	→ R375

The R374 is a Regional Route in South Africa that connects the R31 at Barkly West in the south-west to Windsorton and the N12. Just before Windsorton, the R371 is given off heading north.
