= Willem Appollus =

Namibian politician and schoolteacher

Willem Rudolph Appollus (born 23 September 1946 in Keetmanshoop, ǁKaras Region) is a Namibian politician and schoolteacher. Appollus joined SWAPO in the late 1980s and was one of the two representatives of ǁKaras Region in the National Council of Namibia from 2004 to 2010.

Appollus began teaching in Oosterheim Junior Secondary School in Aroab, Karas Region in 1975. From 1984 to 1986, he received teacher training in Oudtshoorn in the Cape Province of South Africa. He returned to Aroab and taught there until 2004.

In 1998, Appollus was elected councillor of Keetmanshoop Rural constituency. In 2004 he was re-elected, receiving 1,095 of the 2,597 votes cast. Appollus was subsequently elected to represent the ǁKaras Region in the National Council. He served until the end of his term in 2010 and did not seek re-election. His seat in the Aroab constituency office was won by Jims Christian, also of SWAPO.
