= Dibeng =

- Location within Northern Cape Location within South Africa
- Coordinates: 27.583333°S 22.883333°E
- Country: South Africa
- Province: Northern Cape
- District: John Taolo Gaetsewe
- Municipality: Gamagara

Area
  - Total: 9.08 km^{2} (3.51 sq mi)

Population (2011)
  - Total: 7,848
  - Density: 864/km^{2} (2,240/sq mi)

Racial makeup (2011)
  - Black African: 62.2%
  - Coloured: 30.0%
  - Indian/Asian: 0.5%
  - White: 6.5%
  - Other: 0.9%

First languages (2011)
  - Tswana: 48.5%
  - Afrikaans: 46.1%
  - English: 1.4%
  - Zulu: 1.0%
  - Other: 2.9%
- Time zone: UTC+2 (SAST)
- Postal code (street): 8463
- PO box: 8463
- Area code: 053

Dibeng is a town in John Taolo Gaetsewe District Municipality in the Northern Cape province of South Africa, situated on the banks of the dry Gamagara River. The name is Tswana in origin, from deben, and means "first drinking place". Deben is a variant spelling.

== See also ==
- af:NG gemeente Deben
