= R371 (South Africa) =

Regional route in South Africa

Regional route R371
- R371 route map

Location
- Country: South Africa

Highway system
- Numbered routes of South Africa
← R370	→ R372

The R371 is a Regional Route in South Africa that connects Windsorton with the N14 to Kuruman and Vryburg.

== Route ==
Its northern terminus at the N14 is in North West. It heads south to Reivilo. Here it meets the R372 from the east. The two continue south out of the town. After eight kilometres, the latter heads west again. The R371 continues south, but bends south-south-east, and crosses the Northern Cape / North West border five times, emerging in the Northern Cape, before reaching the R370. The two are briefly co-signed heading south-west, before the R371 diverges again heading south-south-east to end at the R374, just west of Windsorton.
