= R370 (South Africa) =

Regional route in South Africa

Regional route R370
- R370 route map

Route information
- Length: 177 km (110 mi)

Major junctions
- South-west end: R385 near Douglas
- N8 in Schmidtsdrift; R31 near Delportshoop; R371 near Spitskop Dam
- North-east end: N18 / R708 in Jan Kempdorp

Location
- Country: South Africa

Highway system
- Numbered routes of South Africa
← R369	→ R371

The R370 is a Regional Route in South Africa that connects Douglas with Jan Kempdorp via Schmidtsdrift.

== Route ==
Its south-western terminus is the R385 just north of Douglas. The route runs north-east, on the north bank of the Vaal River. It reaches the east/west N8 and is briefly cosigned heading east with it. It leaves the N8, at Schmidtsdrift, again heading north-east. It crosses the R31 between Ulco and Delportshoop. After another 40 kilometers it intersects the R371 and is briefly co-signed with it. It ends its route at the N18 at Jan Kempdorp but effectively continues as the R708.
