= Kathu =

- Location within Northern Cape Location within South Africa
- Coordinates: 27°42′S 23°03′E
- Country: South Africa
- Province: Northern Cape
- District: John Taolo Gaetsewe
- Municipality: Gamagara

Area
  - Total: 15.56 km^{2} (6.01 sq mi)

Population (2011)
  - Total: 11,510
  - Density: 739.7/km^{2} (1,916/sq mi)

Racial makeup (2011)
  - Black African: 39.2%
  - Coloured: 21.7%
  - Indian/Asian: 0.6%
  - White: 38.0%
  - Other: 0.6%

First languages (2011)
  - Afrikaans: 62.1%
  - Tswana: 23.4%
  - English: 6.0%
  - Sotho: 1.8%
  - Other: 6.8%
- Time zone: UTC+2 (SAST)
- Postal code (street): 8446
- PO box: 8446
- Area code: 053

Kathu is a growing town in South Africa, and the iron ore capital of the Northern Cape province. Its name means "town under the trees", after the Camel Thorn forest it is situated in. The phrase "the town under the trees" was coined by an engineer working in the town in the early-1990s as part of a tourist marketing drive, together with the accompanying graphic. It was intended to be a marketing slogan. The meaning of the word "Kathu" has anecdotically been attributed to a porridge brewed by the local population from the powder found in the pods of the Camel Thorn trees.

Kathu was founded in the late-1960s or early-1970s.

Kathu is situated between Upington and Vryburg with about a 2-hour drive to each. Kimberley is a 3-hour drive away, while Kuruman is only 20 minutes away.

== Camel thorn tree forest ==
The Camel Thorn tree Acacia erioloba forest is one of only two in the world with the other being between Mariental and Rehoboth in Namibia. Its unique nature was recognized in the early-1920s when it was declared a State Forest. In 1995 it was registered as a Natural Heritage Site. The Kathu Forest is approximately 4000 hectares in size and these Camel thorns trees provide support for large Sociable Weaver’s nests and are used by many other bird and animal species. In fact surveys has shown a moderate to high diversity in animal and plant species, including several Red Data, endemic and protected species in and around the forest. Bigger trees in the forest are reckoned to be older than 300 years.

== Mining ==
The town and the accompanying industrial area of Sishen came into being because of iron ore mining activity in the Kalahari — it has one of the five largest open-cast iron ore mining operations in the world. The primary drilling and 'load and haul' mining equipment used by the mine include giant ore trucks that bear about 260 ton of ore with each load. Mining shovels used to load these trucks can weigh in excess of 800 tons and drilling equipment include drills that can drill up to 400 mm holes for blasting purposes. Some of the world's longest ore trains travel through harsh territory on the Sishen-Saldanha railway to offload their cargo at Saldanha Bay. Kumba Iron Ore is the principal mine operator in Kathu.

== Recreation ==
Kathu has a golf course and a small, well-stocked game reserve also adjoins the town.

The town has a well established sporting complex including tennis courts, swimming pool and a golf course. One of the tennis courts is named after veteran tennis player Herta Hegewisch.

== Kathu Archaeological Site Complex ==
Significant Stone Age sites occur in and around Kathu and on adjacent farms. These are subject to on-going archaeological research.

The importance of the Kathu Pan site was highlighted in the November 16, 2012 issue of the journal Science in which Jayne Wilkins and colleagues reveal evidence of 500 000 year-old stone points (excavated by Peter Beaumont in 1979-1982), argued to be the earliest stone-tipped spears yet found. This conclusion, based partly on study of use wear, is taken to indicate that human ancestors used stone-tipped weapons for hunting 200 000 years earlier than previously thought. Wilkins is quoted as saying that the find does more than simply extend the prehistory of stone-tipped spears – it puts those first spears firmly in the hands of Homo heidelbergensis. "Modern foragers use such tools to take down large game as part of cooperative, strategic hunts. Perhaps our ancestor did so too."

Kathu Townlands, one of the richest early prehistoric archaeological sites at Kathu, has produced tens of thousands of Earlier Stone Age artifacts, including hand axes and other tools and estimated to be between 700,000 and one million years old. It is situated between the Kuruman Hills to the east and the Langberge mountains to the west. These discovery was made in 2013 by archaeologists from the University of Cape Town and the University of Toronto, in collaboration with the McGregor Museum.
