= ATKV =

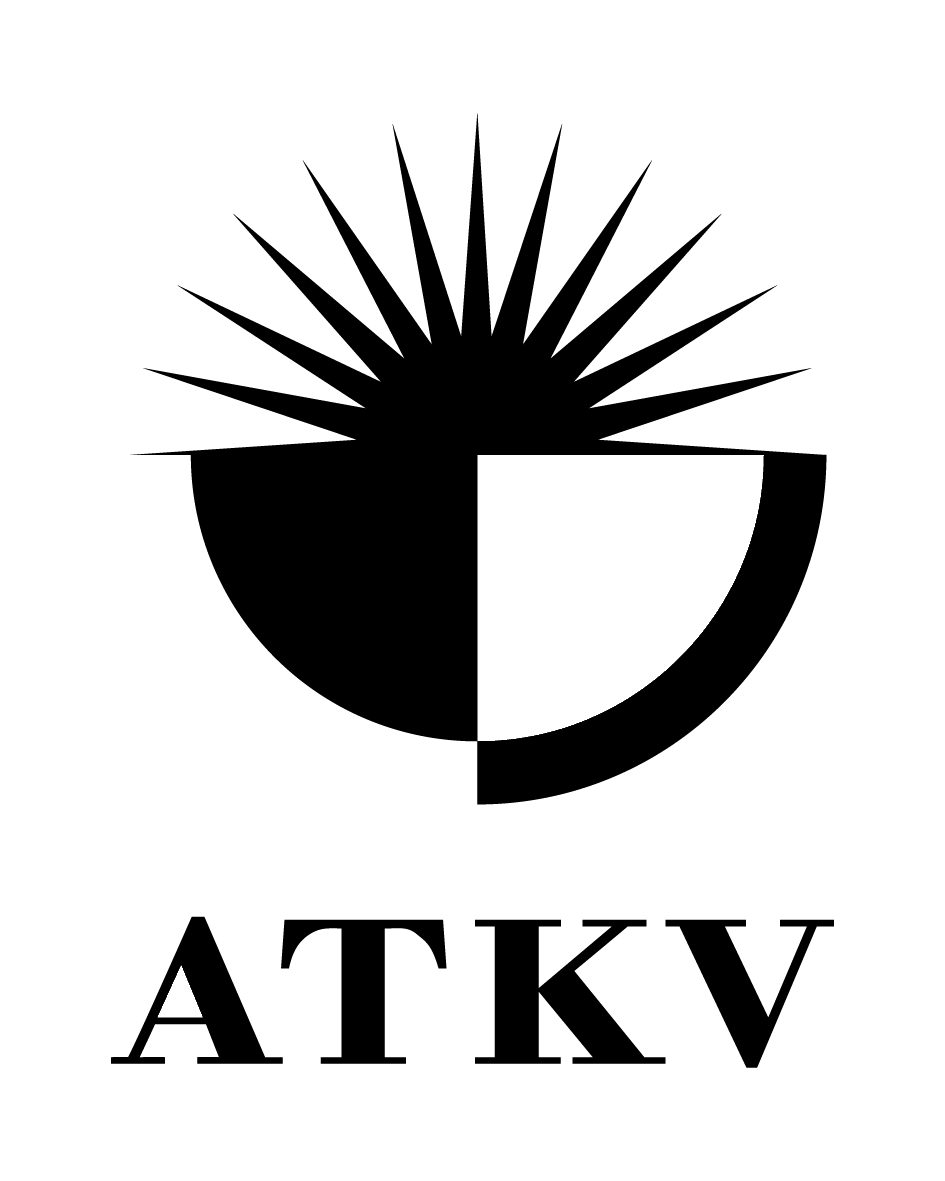
- Founded: 1930; Cape Town, Cape Province, Union of South Africa.
- Type: Non-governmental organisation
- Purpose: Afrikaans language & culture based on Biblical, Christian values.
- Location: Randburg, Republic of South Africa
- Region served: Republic of South Africa & Namibia
- Method: Direct action, lobbying, research, innovation
- Key people: Sonél Brits (Managing Director)
- Website: atkv.org.za

The Afrikaans Language and Culture Association (Afrikaans: Afrikaanse Taal- en Kultuurvereniging), ATKV, is a society that aims to promote the Afrikaans language and culture. The association was founded in 1930 in Cape Town. Since its inception and up to the end of Apartheid in 1994, membership was only open to members of the Afrikaner Christian community. Membership was thereafter opened to include people of all ethnicities, sharing the same values as the ATKV (i.e. speaking Afrikaans and belonging to the Christian faith).

== History ==
The Witwatersrand Gold Rush of 1886 and Anglo Boer War (1899–1902) resulted in an influx of foreigners to the Zuid Afrikaanse Republiek. Because the Boer Republics became British colonies right after the Anglo Boer War, the Afrikaners felt marginalised and stigmatised. This culminated in the mass urbanisation of unskilled Afrikaners during the Great Depression years. Like many British soldiers and immigrants the impoverished Afrikaners found refuge in the former South African Railways. Provision was made for them by the South African Government in railway camps (a forerunner of the Apartheid Township) later known as "Spoorwegkampe".

The combination of the above factors caused the Afrikaners to fear erosion of their culture and language. In 1930 Edwin Robert Carney and Sybrand (Sybie) Jacobus van der Spuy started talking about an association for Afrikaners. Van der Spuy felt that an Afrikaans debate association would be sufficient. Edwin Carney showed preference to the idea of an Afrikaans language and culture association because in his opinion such an association would have more bargaining power to the authorities.

On Tuesday, 19 August 1930, twelve Afrikaners from different sections of the railway services met in Cape Town and the Afrikaans Language and Cultural Association (ATKV) was founded. Sybie van der Spuy was chosen as the first chairman and HJ Kamerman as the first secretary of the newly founded ATKV.

== Controversy ==
The ATKV has been controversial on membership issues in the past, most notably:

- In 2000 the ATKV rejected two applicants because they did not comply with the organisation's policy that members had to belong to the Christian faith.
- Again, in 2004 the ATKV was as the center of a membership issue when it denied a Muslim couple membership to its Goudini spa. Fritz Kok (managing director of the organisation at that time) said: "We do not exclude other religious beliefs and cultures from participating in projects and festivals which we run throughout the year. Everyone is welcome. However, when it comes to applying for membership, we have to be united in our beliefs as we are the ones who formulate important policies on various issues. The ATKV was founded with Christian values at the core of its operations. We follow all our business dealings and other operations under the guidance of what the Bible says. Therefore we cannot have members of other faiths join – there would be conflict of beliefs,".

== Publications ==
Die Taalgenoot is a quarterly magazine published by the ATKV for its members, with content sourced from Afrikaans speaking people in South Africa and in the diaspora.

== Holiday resorts ==
The ATKV owns and operates seven holiday resorts in South Africa. Historically these resorts were only open to white Afrikaans speakers that were members of the ATKV. Since the early 1990s these resorts have been open to the general public with discount to organisation members.

These seven resorts are:

- Buffelspoort (near Rustenburg).
- Drakensville (nestles in the foothills of the majestic Amphitheatre in the Northern Drakensberg, approximately 350 km from Johannesburg and 250 km from Durban between the town Bergville and Jagersrust).
- Eiland Spa (within the Hans Merensky-nature reserve).
- Goudini Spa (near Worcester, Western Cape).
- Hartenbos (in Hartenbos).
- Klein-Kariba (near Bela-Bela).
- Natalia (in Illovo Beach, Kingsburgh).

== Crescendo / CrescendoKreatief ==
Beginning 1974, ATKV started organising an annual music competition dedicated to Afrikaans music. The competition was known as Crescendo from its inception until 2005. In 2006, it was renamed CrescendoKreatief and became a songwriting-based competition. The competition was terminated after the 2012 competition season.

Winners of Crescendo

- 1974 – Eoudia de Kock / Rouel Beukes
- 1975 – Randall Wicomb
- 1976 – Randall Wicomb
- 1977 – Randall Wicomb
- 1978 – Rina Hugo / Bruce Sanderson
- 1979 – Anneli van Rooyen
- 1980 – Karin Hougaard
- 1981 – Gisela de Villiers
- 1982 – Johan Badenhorst
- 1983 – Stephen Mundell
- 1984 – Take 5
- 1985 – Innes / Franna Benadé
- 1986 – Pieter van der Westhuizen / Gavin Davies
- 1987 – Bosch-Troebadoers
- 1988 – Coleské
- 1989 – Greta Jones
- 1990 – Die Boschenzangers
- 1991 – Rian du Toit
- 1992 – Natasja Groeneveld
- 1993 – Lizanne Helberg
- 1994 – Sanet Nel
- 1995 – Wikus du Toit
- 1997 – Anna Davel
- 1998 – B-Natural
- 1999 – Petronel Baard
- 2000 – Réana Nel
- 2001 – Joe Niemand / Jaco du Plessis
- 2002 – Jak de Priester
- 2003 – Hi-5
- 2004 – Werner van Coller
- 2005 – Carlè van Deventer

Winners of CrescendoKreatief

- 2006 – Hanno van Heerden
- 2007 – Geen
- 2008 – William Loots
- 2009 – Shane Heynie
- 2010 – Elzahn Rinquest
- 2011 – Babette Viljoen
- 2012 – Fran Carstens

== Projects ==
The ATKV has been active in many areas of South African culture and language.

Some projects ATKV are part of or sponsor include:

- National Afrikaans Olympiad
- Rieldans
- Ligteliedjiewerkswinkel (Song writing)
- Mediaveertjies (Media Awards)
- ATKV-Tienertoneel (Teen – Drama) https://atkv.org.za/neem-deel/jeugprojekte/tienertoneel/
- ATKV-Tjokkertoneel (Primary School - Drama) https://atkv.org.za/neem-deel/jeugprojekte/tjokkertoneel/
- ATKV-Skryfskool (Writing School)
- ATKV-Applous (School Choir Competition)https://atkv.org.za/neem-deel/jeugprojekte/applous/
- ATKV-Komposisiekompetisie (Composition Competition) https://atkv.org.za/neem-deel/musiek-en-dansprojekte/komposisiekompetisie/
- ATKV-Entrepreneurs https://atkv.org.za/neem-deel/jeugprojekte/entrepreneurs/
- ATKV-Redenaars (Public speaking) https://atkv.org.za/neem-deel/jeugprojekte/redenaars/
- ATKV-Spanredenaars (Public Speaking)
- ATKV-Debat (Debate)https://atkv.org.za/neem-deel/jeugprojekte/debat/
- ATKV-Jeugleierssimposium (Youth leaders symposium) https://atkv.org.za/neem-deel/jeugprojekte/jeugleiersimposium/
- ATKV-Jeugberaad (Youth Discussion)https://atkv.org.za/neem-deel/jeugprojekte/jeugberaad/
- ATKV-Leiersontwikkeling (Leader Development)
- ATKV-Spelathon (Spelling competition) https://atkv.org.za/neem-deel/jeugprojekte/spelathon/

They also sponsor several South African arts festivals:

- Aardklop
- KKNK (Klein Karoo Nasionale Kunstefees)
- Nampo – Agricultural Trade Show (Held annually near Bothaville in the Free State Province).
- InniBOS
- Vryfees
- Woordfees
- Snoek & Patat Fees

== Other areas of operation ==
=== ATKV Hartenbos Museum ===
During 1937 the ATKV decided to establish a museum in Hartenbos. As the idea of the Symbolic Ox Wagon Trek of 1938 originated in Hartenbos, the museum concentrates on the Great Trek of 1838 (when the Boers, dissatisfied with British rule, left the Cape Colony en masse). The museum also focuses on the history of Hartenbos itself.

The Museum is well stocked with ox wagons, weapons, and other historic artefacts, and is divided into ten halls depicting various aspects of the overall theme:

- Hall 1: Preparation for the Great Trek;
- Hall 2: Outspan (camping and relaxing) at the end of a day's journey;
- Hall 3: Repairing the ox wagons;
- Hall 4: Building the laager (a camp with the wagons drawn into a circle for protections against attack);
- Hall 5: Relaxation during the Great Trek
- Hall 6: Daily activities (baking bread, candle making);
- Hall 7: Settling after the journey (featuring family worship in a Boer homestead);
- Hall 8: The Voortrekkers’ freedom struggle;
- Hall 9: The Symbolic Ox Wagon Trek of 1938;
- Hall 10: The History of Hartenbos.
