= Keetmanshoop Rural =

Electoral constituency in Namibia

Coordinates: 26°48′S 19°39′E

Keetmanshoop Rural constituency (red) in the ǁKaras Region

Keetmanshoop Rural is an electoral constituency in the ǁKaras Region of Namibia. It covers an area of 37,922 km^{2} (14,642 sq mi) and contains the Krönlein suburb of Keetmanshoop and the villages of Koës and Aroab, the settlements of Seeheim and Klein Karas, as well as several farming communities in the area. Keetmanshoop Rural had a population of 7,219 in 2011, up from 6,399 in 2001. As of 2020 the constituency had 6,398 registered voters.

The constituency office is situated in Aroab.

== Politics ==
Keetmanshoop Rural is traditionally a stronghold of the South West Africa People's Organization (SWAPO) party. In the 2004 regional elections, Aroab schoolteacher and sitting councillor Willem Appollus (SWAPO) was reelected with 1,095 of the 2,597 votes cast. He was subsequently elected by the ǁKaras Regional council to represent the region in the National Council. Apollus did not seek re-election in 2010. In the 2010 regional elections, SWAPO's Jims Christiaan won the constituency with 736 votes. He defeated challengers was Simon Johannes Jantze of Rally for Democracy and Progress (RDP, 648 votes), Bartholomeus Rooi of Democratic Turnhalle Alliance (DTA, 433 votes) and Joseph Isaaks of the Congress of Democrats (CoD, 88 votes).

In the 2015 regional elections, Elias Kharuxab of SWAPO won the constituency with 1,288 votes. He defeated challengers Moses Timotheus Titus (DTA, 474 votes) and Willem Martin Stephanus (RDP, 269 votes). The 2020 regional election was Gerrit Witbooi from the Landless People's Movement (LPM, a new party registered in 2018). He obtained 1,817 votes. Kharuxab, the sitting SWAPO councillor, came second with 919 votes. In 2023, Witbooi was recalled as the regional councillor by his party, his membership in the party was also terminated. In the by-election necessitated by Witbooi's withdrawal, LPM candidate Petrus Labuschagne (LPM) claimed the seat with 1270 votes. He defeated other candidates such as Elias Kharuxab (Swapo) 872, Witbooi (now an independent candidate, 463 votes), Johannes Eiman of the Popular Democratic Movement (PDM, the new name of the DTA) 275 votes and Magdalena van Staden of the Independent Patriots for Change (IPC, an opposition party founded in 2020) 32 votes.
