= Gamagara Local Municipality =

Gamagara
- Local municipality
- Seal

- Location in the Northern Cape
- Coordinates: 27°40′S 23°00′E
- Country: South Africa
- Province: Northern Cape
- District: John Taolo Gaetsewe
- Seat: Kathu
- Wards: 8

Government
  - Type: Municipal council
  - Mayor: Henriette du Plessis (DA)

Area
  - Total: 2,619 km^{2} (1,011 sq mi)

Population (2022)
  - Total: 29,580
  - Density: 11.29/km^{2} (29.25/sq mi)

Racial makeup (2022)
  - Black African: 46.2%
  - Coloured: 33.8%
  - Indian/Asian: 1.1%
  - White: 18.8%

First languages (2011)
  - Afrikaans: 53.9%
  - Tswana: 33.7%
  - English: 3.6%
  - Sotho: 1.4%
  - Other: 7.4%
- Time zone: UTC+2 (SAST)
- Municipal code: NC453
- Website: gamagara.gov.za

Gamagara Municipality (Afrikaans: Gamagara Munisipaliteit; Tswana: Mmasepala wa Gamagara) is a local municipality within the John Taolo Gaetsewe District Municipality, in the Northern Cape province of South Africa.

== Name ==
The name Gamogara is of Setswana origin. The municipality is named after a dry river which was in turn named after a man called Mogara of the Makwere clan (Batlhaping). During the early days of exploration, Mogara was the first person to settle in this part of the country.

After 1887, the area became dominated by White farmers who then changed the name as they were unable to pronounce it correctly. Hence it was called Gamagara instead of Gamogara.

The name is derived from a dry river that ran from Dibeng to join the Kuruman (Segonyana) river at Dikgatlong tsa ga Kganyile. Incidentally, this is the route the Ba ga Motlhware followed on their way to their headquarters, Maje a Mokhothu (Langeberg).

== Main places ==
The 2001 census divided the municipality into the following main places:

Place	Code	Area (km^{2})	Population
Dibeng	32401	8.58	4,023
Dingleton	32402	1.56	2,866
Ditloung	31903	0.62	3,044
Kathu	32404	8.53	8,247
Olifantshoek	31907	3.51	3,985
Remainder of the municipality	32403	2,449.38	1,048

== Demographics ==
According to the 2022 South African census, the municipality had a population of 29,580 people. Of these, 46.2% identified as "Black African," 33.8% as "Coloured," and 18.8 as "White."

=== Household income ===
Gamagara is the municipality with the highest average taxable income in the entirety of South Africa. This is as a result of a small tax base and highly lucrative employment opportunities. Mining town and rail jobs related to the iron ore industry are known to often be well-paid, and average taxable income across a small population is therefore skewed by a small number of high earners.

In January 2026, according to the South African Revenue Service, Gamagara's average taxable income across its 10,979 taxpayers was R508,901 - significantly (57%) above the national average of just over R323,000.

== Politics ==
The municipal council consists of fifteen members elected by mixed-member proportional representation. Eight councillors are elected by first-past-the-post voting in eight wards, while the remaining seven are chosen from party lists so that the total number of party representatives is proportional to the number of votes received. In the election of 1 November 2021 no party obtained a majority of seats on the council. The following table shows the results of the election.

Gamagara local election, 1 November 2021
Party	Votes				Seats		
Party	Ward	List	Total	%	Ward	List	Total
African National Congress	4,973	4,961	9,934	43.1%	6	1	7
Democratic Alliance	3,931	4,005	7,936	34.4%	2	3	5
Gamagara Community Forum	1,556	1,503	3,059	13.3%	0	2	2
Economic Freedom Fighters	861	798	1,659	7.2%	0	1	1
Freedom Front Plus	220	218	438	1.9%	0	0	0
South African Royal Kingdoms Organization	6	36	42	0.2%	0	0	0
Total	11,547	11,521	23,068		8	7	15
Valid votes	11,547	11,521	23,068	98.7%			
Spoilt votes	146	151	297	1.3%			
Total votes cast	11,693	11,672	23,365				
Voter turnout	11,707						
Registered voters	23,135						
Turnout percentage	50.6%						
