= Rieldans =

Celebratory dance of southern Africa

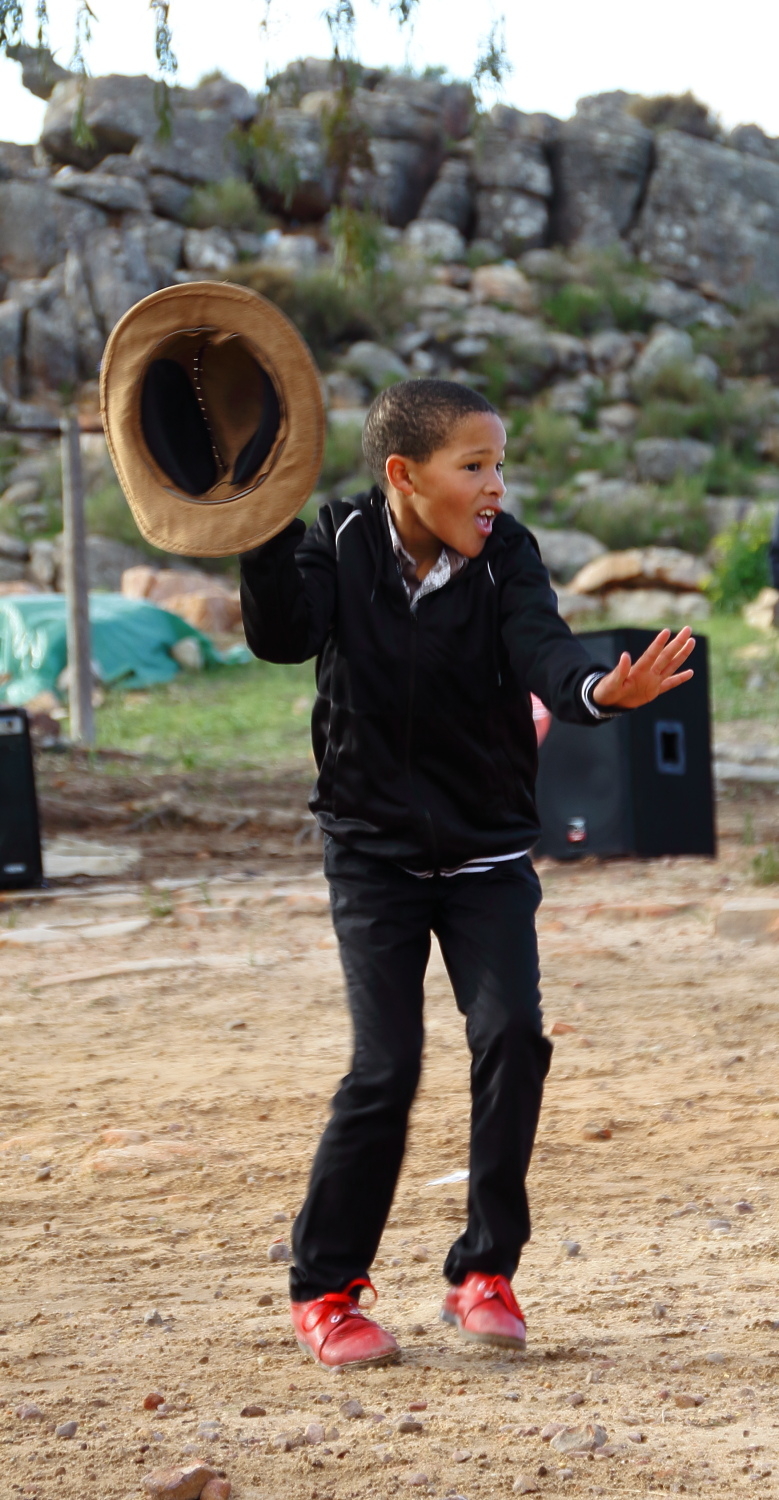

Riel (or Rieldans) is a Afrikaans word for an ancient celebratory dance performed by the San (also known as Bushmen), Nama and Khoi. It is considered one of the oldest dancing styles of indigenous South Africa. Also known as Ikhapara by the Nama, it is danced at an energetic pace and demands a lot of fancy footwork.

== Etymology ==
The dance was not originally called "riel". The original Khoisan and San languages had mostly disappeared and in South Africa these groups mostly speak Afrikaans. The word was later borrowed from "reel", a Scottish folk dance and in Afrikaans the dance became known as the "riel". In Nama the dance is known as Ikhapara which is derived from the word "khapas" which means "hat". The hat of the man is a useful article to win a lady's hand in marriage

== History ==
The riel is the oldest entertainment form used as a social, cultural and educational tool by the Khoisan people long before Western cultures and traditions arrived at the Cape of Good Hope. It is an age-old dance of the Khoisan hunters, with distinct Irish and Scottish folk music influences, all performed to the beat of "boeremusiek", Dutch folk songs and minstrel songs of the south of America (Click here for an example.). It became the dance of the working classes, particularly between the 1940s and 1950s and was danced, especially in the Northern Cape, Karoo and some other regions.

This lively dance was danced around the campfire after hunting expeditions, good harvests or during a celebration Later it also became the dance of farmworkers and sheep shearers, whose daily activities are often portrayed during a dance.

The riel was made popular again in recent years and is a true celebration of ancient traditions that finds new expression in contemporary forms. Its modern version has elements of colonialism as the accompanying instrumentation includes guitar and violin, and the outfits adorning the dances are commonly known as 'working class clothes'.

=== Dance style classification ===
The Riel Dance

==== General ====
The most outstanding feature of the riel is the ingenious and frantic footwork and energetic pace at which it is danced. The dance was performed in the dusty sands around a campfire and thus the dance is described by a beautiful Afrikaans expression: "Dans lat die stof so staan" (Dancing at a fast and energetic pace resulting in a lot of dust)

The unique dance is performed by a group, often in a circle. This dance consists of cultural movements (gestures) and is often used to tell a story It is about wooing and lovemaking, and takes some of its moves from animal-like movements and animal courtship, particularly the ostrich. The bright colours of prancing animals' is portrayed in the characteristic colourful costumes.

=== Styles and moves ===
Dance moves portray the wooing between man and female and this is portrayed through imitation of animal and bird movements, such as the butterfly, antelope, baboons, snakes, meerkat and horses, as well as the flirting of pigeons, rooster, turkey and ostrich male. These movements include, "bokspring" (gamboling), "kapperjol", trotting and strutting as horses.

The Afrikaans idiom "vlerksleep" (courtship dance like a bird) is displayed in the riel. The man use his coat panel, his arm or his hat held in his hand, to court with a lady or for example, to invite her to dance.

There is also the ever-popular monkey dance or depictions of the working environment, the galloping of horses, sheep shearing or herdsman dance. Everyday use is manifested in the "askoek" slapping, where the right foot is securely placed above the left knee and slapped – or vice versa – to demonstrate how excess ash are dusted from the "askoek" (a bread baked in ashes).

=== Instruments ===
The dance is characterized by lively music and music instruments such as the "ramkie" (tin guitar made out of an empty oil can and a piece of wood with strings), odd handmade violin or, sometimes, a banjo, accordion or mouth organ, are used as accompaniment

=== Competitive dancing ===
In an effort to preserve the riel from dying out, the riel project was officially launched in 2006 by the Afrikaanse Taal en Kultuurverening (ATKV) as one of their cultural community projects. The ATKV has been hosting a national rieldans championship with regional elimination rounds culminating in a final competition. It started out with only four groups who compete against it other. Within four years the culture event became one of its most successful ATKV cultural initiatives.

In July 2015 the "Nuwe Graskoue Trappers" and their orchestra from Wupperthal, competed at the World Championship of Performing Arts, an international cultural competition in Los Angeles, United States, and won 14 gold and eight silver medals in the senior dance category, and the band of musicians won seven silver medals in the senior instruments category. They also received a trophy for being the winners in the open dance category.
