= Olifantshoek =

- Location within Northern Cape Location within South Africa
- Coordinates: 27°56′S 22°44′E
- Country: South Africa
- Province: Northern Cape
- District: John Taolo Gaetsewe
- Municipality: Gamagara

Area
  - Total: 66.59 km^{2} (25.71 sq mi)

Population (2011)
  - Total: 10,233
  - Density: 153.7/km^{2} (398.0/sq mi)

Racial makeup (2011)
  - Black African: 42.5%
  - Coloured: 47.7%
  - Indian/Asian: 0.6%
  - White: 5.5%
  - Other: 3.8%

First languages (2011)
  - Afrikaans: 78.9%
  - Tswana: 10.2%
  - English: 2.1%
  - Sotho: 1.3%
  - Other: 7.4%
- Time zone: UTC+2 (SAST)
- Postal code (street): 8450
- PO box: 8450
- Area code: 053

Olifantshoek is a town in John Taolo Gaetsewe District Municipality in the Northern Cape Province of South Africa.

The village is 60 km northwest of Postmasburg and 80 km southwest of Kuruman. It developed from a police post and is administered by a village management board. The name is of Afrikaans origin and means "elephants' corner" or "elephants' glen", referring to the many elephant skeletons that Dutch settlers found in the area. It may also be translated from Tswana "ditlou".

== History ==
The town was officially founded in 1912. The town was allegedly named after the tusk of an elephant that was used to purchase the farm on which the town was built. Many other elephant bones were found in the area.

== Geography ==
Olifantshoek lies at the foot of the Lange Mountains on the Namakwari Route in the Northern Cape Province of South Africa. For millions of years, a natural reservoir beneath the dunes has washed the red oxide out of the sand leaving white dunes which remain. These white dunes contrast against the rust-red sand of the rest of the Kalahari. During hot and dry conditions, the grains of sand rub together to create a deep hum. These sounds are best heard close to the dunes during the summer months between September and April. Rain silences the sounds of the dunes. The town is also known as the ‘Gateway to the White and Roaring Sands’.

== Climate ==
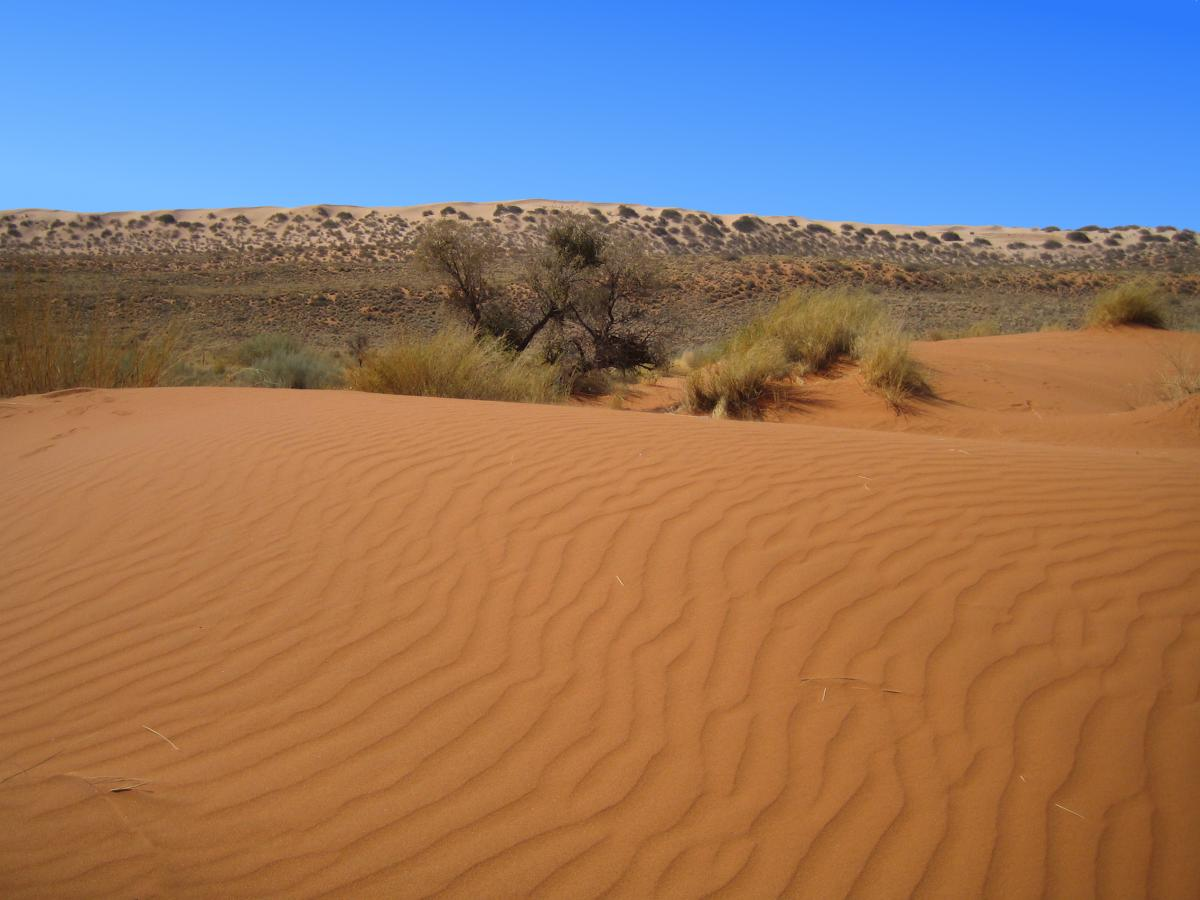
The red and white dunes of the Kalahari desert

Olifantshoek is situated within both the Savanna and Nama-Karoo biomes, and is a semi-arid region. Average yearly rainfall is 242mm per annum with the majority of the rain falling in summer. Day temperatures often reach over 35 degrees Celsius in mid-summer. Winters are clear and dry, and, while daytime temperatures average 21 degrees Celsius, temperatures often drop below zero at night.

== Attractions ==
=== Witsand Nature Reserve ===
The Witsand Nature Reserve has white sand dunes which are surrounded by contrasting red sand dunes. The reserve spans over 2,500 hectares of land with dunes up to 100 metres high and 10 kilometres in length. These white dunes are also known as the Kalahari Roaring Sands due to the sounds they make under certain weather conditions. The colouring of the dunes is believed to have been formed by numerous hills beneath the sand. Wildlife that can be observed in the nature reserve include meerkats, pangolins and aardvarks. Larger antelope such as the red hartebeest, springbok, gemsbok and kudu can also be seen. Nocturnal wildlife includes the porcupine, aardwolf, bat-eared fox, Cape fox, genet, springhare and owl.

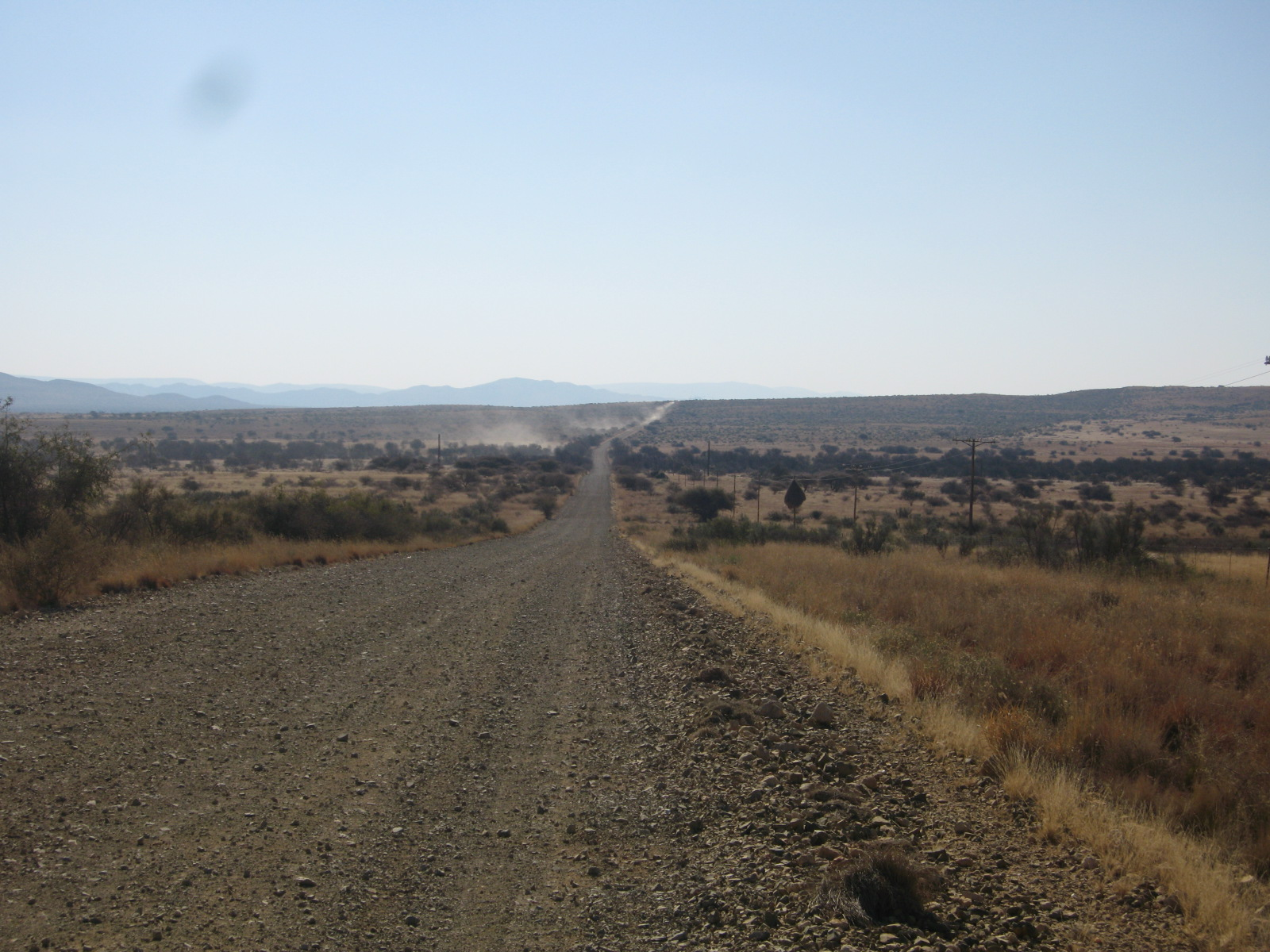
The road leading to Olifantshoek

=== Hiking trails ===
The Neylan and the Pudu hiking trails are available for exploration in Olifantshoek.

=== San Rock Paintings ===
There are numerous engravings and San rock art paintings in the Olifantshoek area. Some of these can be viewed on Meerlust and Pan Heuwel farms.

=== War Grave ===
The war graves cemetery in Olifantshoek dates back to 1879. The graves are of the deceased during the Galeshewe wars fought between the inhabitants of the old Transvaal and the Tswana people on the western perimeter of the old Transvaal Republic. These graves are on the Fuller farm.

== See also ==
- Tswalu Kalahari Reserve
- Maria Moroka Nature Reserve
- Askham
- Williston
