= Joe Morolong Local Municipality =

Joe Morolong
- Local municipality
- Seal

- Location in the Northern Cape
- Coordinates: 27°S 23°E
- Country: South Africa
- Province: Northern Cape
- District: John Taolo Gaetsewe
- Seat: 29
- Wards: 15

Government
  - Type: Municipal council
  - Mayor: Dineo Leutlwetse-Tshabalala

Area
  - Total: 20,172 km^{2} (7,788 sq mi)

Population (2022)
  - Total: 125,420
  - Density: 6.2175/km^{2} (16.103/sq mi)

Racial makeup (2011)
  - Black African: 97.5%
  - Coloured: 1.4%
  - Indian/Asian: 0.5%
  - White: 0.6%

First languages (2011)
  - Tswana: 90.7%
  - Afrikaans: 3.6%
  - English: 1.9%
  - Other: 3.8%
- Time zone: UTC+2 (SAST)
- Municipal code: NC451

Joe Morolong Municipality (Tswana: Mmasepala wa Joe Morolong), formerly Moshaweng Municipality, is a local municipality within the John Taolo Gaetsewe District Municipality, in the Northern Cape province of South Africa.

Moshaweng is a Setswana name for "place of sand".

== Main places ==
The 2001 census divided the municipality into the following main places:

Place	Code	Area (km^{2})	Population	Most spoken language
Batlhaping Ba Ga Jantjie	62101	0.73	48	Setswana
Batlhaping Ba Ga Sehunelo	62102	737.16	3,305	Setswana
Batlharo Ba Ga Motlhware	62103	2,647.09	27,063	Setswana
Batlharo Ba Ga Phadima	62104	451.26	6,531	Setswana
Batlharo Ba Lotlhware	62105	169.22	1,050	Setswana
Blackrock	39501	17.11	1,002	Afrikaans
Hotazel	39502	29.92	1,232	Setswana
Kalahari	39503	10,651.43	3,166	Setswana
Kudumane	62106	2,024.22	46,111	Setswana
Van Zylsrus	39504	0.90	848	Setswana

== Demographics ==
According to the 2022 South African census, the municipality had a population of 125,420 people. Of those, 97.5% identified as "Black African," 1.4% as "Coloured," and 0.6% as "White."

== Politics ==
The municipal council consists of twenty-nine members elected by mixed-member proportional representation. Fifteen councillors are elected by first-past-the-post voting in fifteen wards, while the remaining fourteen are chosen from party lists so that the total number of party representatives is proportional to the number of votes received. In the election of 1 November 2021 the African National Congress (ANC) won a majority of eighteen seats on the council. The following table shows the results of the election.

Joe Morolong local election, 1 November 2021
Party	Votes				Seats		
Party	Ward	List	Total	%	Ward	List	Total
African National Congress	14,419	15,174	29,593	60.2%	13	5	18
Economic Freedom Fighters	6,754	6,817	13,571	27.6%	2	6	8
Democratic Alliance	770	793	1,563	3.2%	0	1	1
Independent candidates	1,313	–	1,313	2.7%	0	–	0
Forum for Service Delivery	464	746	1,210	2.5%	0	1	1
South African Royal Kingdoms Organization	341	415	756	1.5%	0	1	1
United Christian Democratic Party	255	448	703	1.4%	0	0	0
Freedom Front Plus	211	232	443	0.9%	0	0	0
Total	24,527	24,625	49,152		15	14	29
Valid votes	24,527	24,625	49,152	96.6%			
Spoilt votes	859	857	1,716	3.4%			
Total votes cast	25,386	25,482	50,868				
Voter turnout	25,836						
Registered voters	49,979						
Turnout percentage	51.7%						
