= Van Zylsrus =

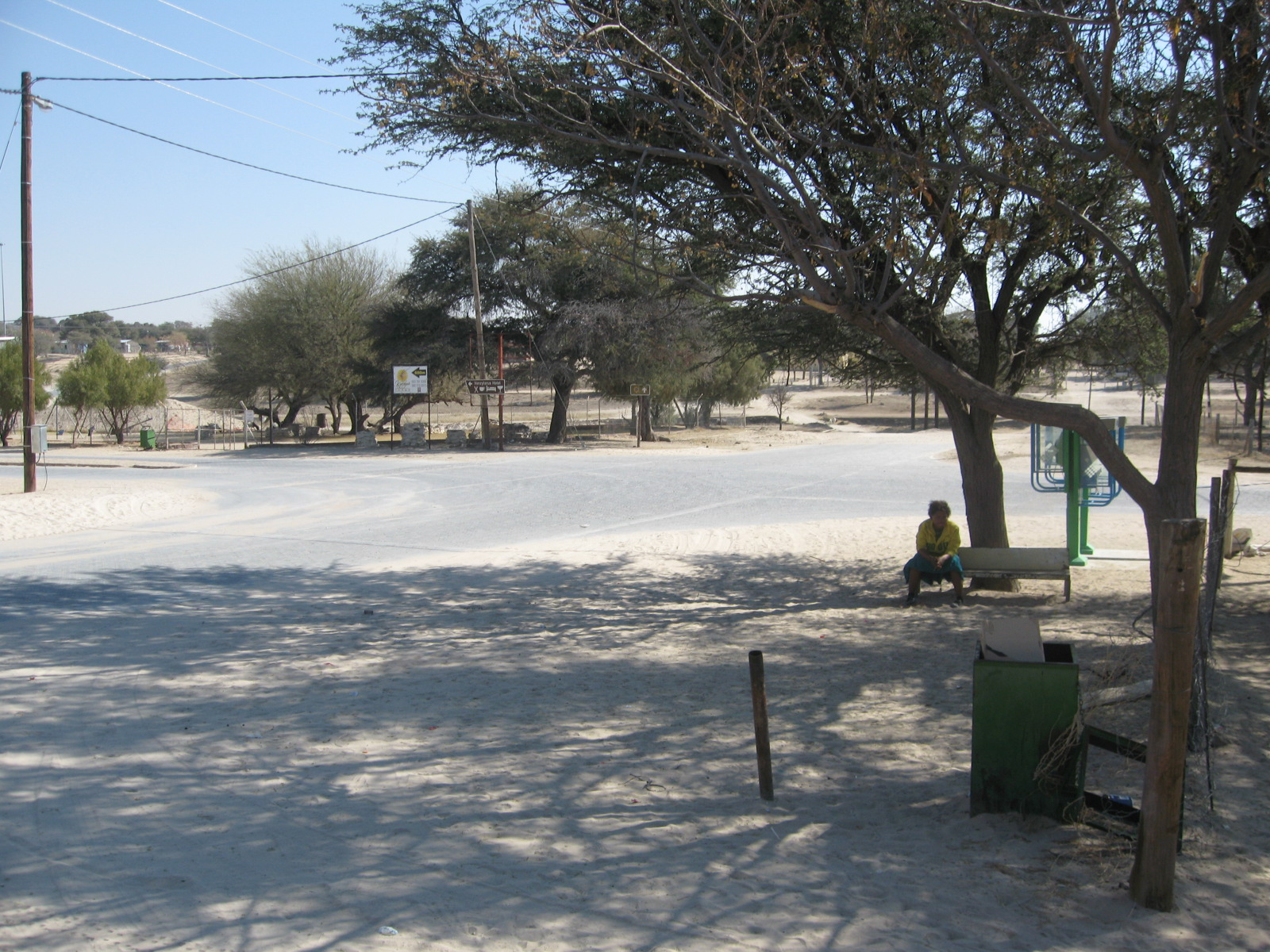
- Van Zylsrus

- Location within Northern Cape Location within South Africa
- Coordinates: 26.867°S 22.050°E
- Country: South Africa
- Province: Northern Cape
- District: John Taolo Gaetsewe
- Municipality: Joe Morolong

Area
  - Total: 0.90 km^{2} (0.35 sq mi)

Population (2001)
  - Total: 848
  - Density: 940/km^{2} (2,400/sq mi)

Racial makeup (2001)
  - Black African: 86.6%
  - Coloured: 9.2%
  - White: 4.2%

First languages (2001)
  - Tswana: 52.5%
  - Afrikaans: 45.3%
  - Southern Ndebele: 1.1%
  - Sotho: 1.1%
- Time zone: UTC+2 (SAST)
- PO box: 8467
- Area code: 053

Van Zylsrus is a settlement in John Taolo Gaetsewe District Municipality in the Northern Cape province of South Africa.

It is also the nearest settlement to The Kalahari Meerkat Project, the filming of nature TV shows such as Meerkat Manor.

The settlement was founded by 6 Trekboer families in 1832, led by the former Heemrad of Calvinia, Petrus van Zyl.

Between 1971 and 2001 it was the location of a Ballistic Missile Battery of the SADF, colocated with an Infantry Company plus a Heavy Mortar Platoon, an Armoured Squadron less one troop, and an advance Radar and Signals Squadron of the SAAF. The settlement also had its own Commando platoon of 21 Riflemen reinforced by the local SAP helicopter flight and Askari detachment. On October 24, 2020, a maximum temperature of 43.3 °C (109.9 °F) was registered.
