= Koës =

- Village
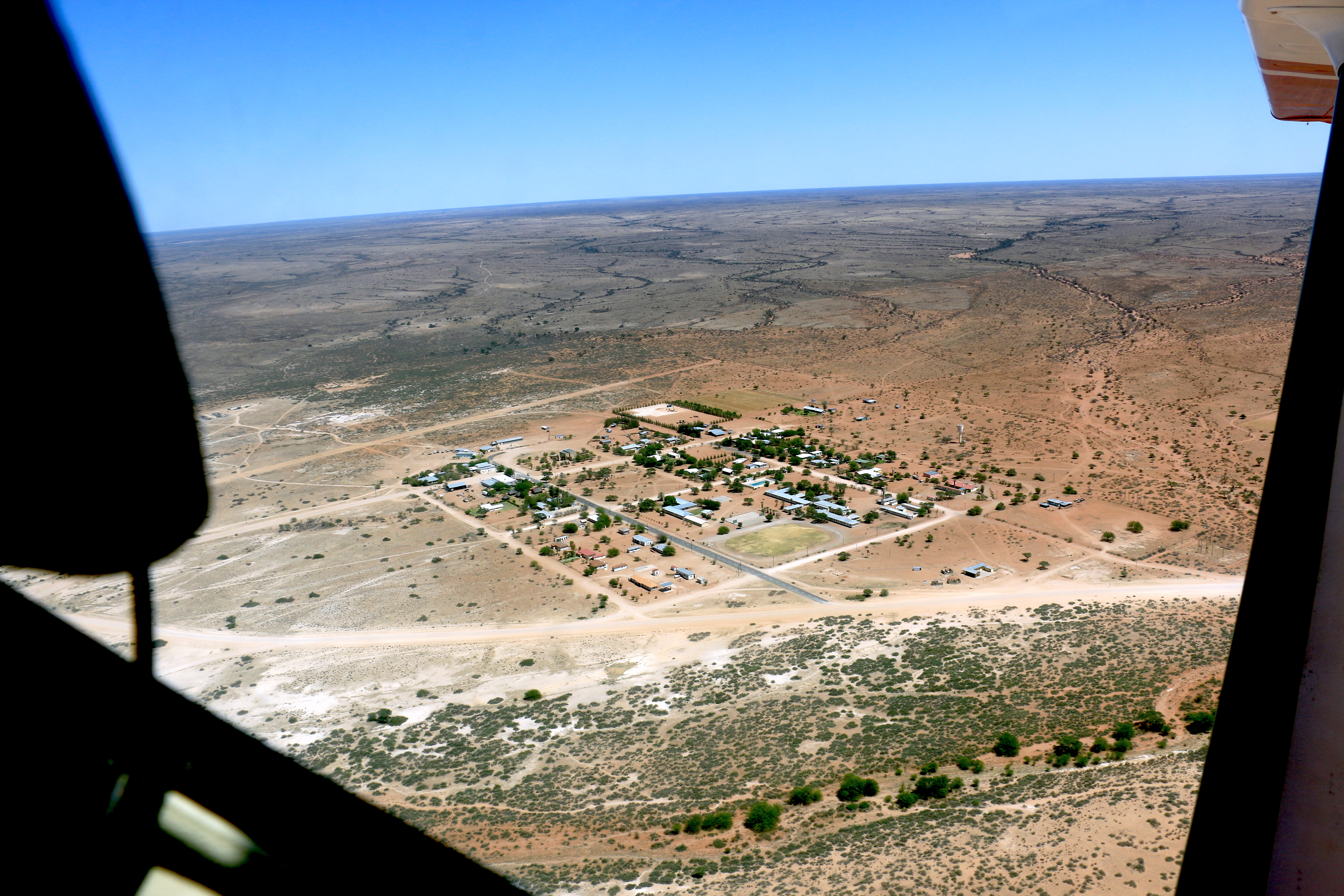
- Bird's Eye View of Koës (2015)

- Location in Namibia
- Coordinates: 25°57′S 19°07′E
- Country: Namibia
- Region: ǁKaras Region
- Constituency: Keetmanshoop Rural

Population (2023)
  - Total: 2,264
- Time zone: UTC+2 (SAST)
- Climate: BWh

Pronunciation of Koës

Koës is a village in the ǁKaras Region of south-eastern Namibia. It had 2,264 inhabitants in 2023.

== Geography ==
Koës is situated on the edge of the Kalahari Desert and belongs to the Keetmanshoop Rural electoral constituency. The average annual rainfall is about 150-200 mm.

Historical population
Year	Pop.	±% p.a.
2011	1,530	—
2023	2,264	+3.32%

== Economy and infrastructure ==
The vast majority of income in the district is generated on ranches in the surrounding area and stem from sheep, goat and cattle ranching for meat production purposes. The most common sheep breed farmed here, is the Dorper, with Persian, Damara, Van Rooy, Karakul and others to a lesser extent. Popular cattle breeds for this area are Nguni, Bonsmara, Brahman and various others to a lesser extent. Various sheep, cattle and goat stud breeders are registered in the area.

During the months of May - Aug (winter) meat hunting takes place on a large scale. Huntable species are Oryx (gemsbok), Springbok and Kudu. To a lesser extent, trophy hunting is also available.

Koës has a government primary school. There is also a post office, police station, village council, hotel, library, farmer's cooperative, general dealer and coffee shop.

The annual Koës Pan Rally is a DIY motorsports event that originated in 1985, held in the first week of July.

== Politics ==
Koës is governed by a village council that currently has five seats.

Upon Namibian independence Koës was governed by a seven-seat village council. The first local elections run in Namibia, the 1992 Namibian local elections was won by the Democratic Turnhalle Alliance (DTA) which obtained 268 votes and gained five seats. One seat each went to SWAPO (89 votes) and the South West Africa National Union (SWANU, 40 votes). In the 1998 local authority elections, the DTA won by a much smaller margin. It gained 173 votes and four seats. SWAPO got the remaining thee seats with 120 votes.

The 2015 local authority election was won by SWAPO which gained three seats (336 votes). One seat each went to the DTA (105 votes) and the Rally for Democracy and Progress (RDP, 57 votes). In the 2020 local authority election "serious procedural errors" were discovered for the Koës village council. Some voters had been handed ballot papers meant for Keetmanshoop. No initial result were announced, and the electoral court ordered a re-run. The re-run was conducted on 26 February 2021 and won by the newly formed Landless People's Movement (LPM). LPM gained 376 votes and three seats in the village council, followed by SWAPO with two seats (274 votes).
