= Rietfontein =

- Location within Northern Cape Location within South Africa
- Coordinates: 26.7333°S 20.0333°E
- Country: South Africa
- Province: Northern Cape
- District: ZF Mgcawu
- Municipality: Dawid Kruiper

Area
  - Total: 1.80 km^{2} (0.69 sq mi)

Population (2011)
  - Total: 2,293
  - Density: 1,270/km^{2} (3,300/sq mi)

Racial makeup (2011)
  - Black African: 5,6%
  - Coloured: 92.5%
  - Indian/Asian: 1.0%
  - White: 0,5%
  - Other: 0,3%

First languages (2011)
  - Afrikaans: 25.5%
  - Sign language: 1.4%
  - English: 1.0%
  - Tswana: 75.0%
  - Other: 1.1%
- Time zone: UTC+2 (SAST)
- Postal code (street): 8811
- PO box: 8811

Rietfontein is a town in ZF Mgcawu District Municipality located in the Northern Cape province of South Africa. It functions as the Rietfontein Borderpost with Namibia during the day hours of 08:00-16:30, that gives access to and from south-east Namibia via Aroab on the C16 main road.
