= Bonsmara =

Breed of cattle

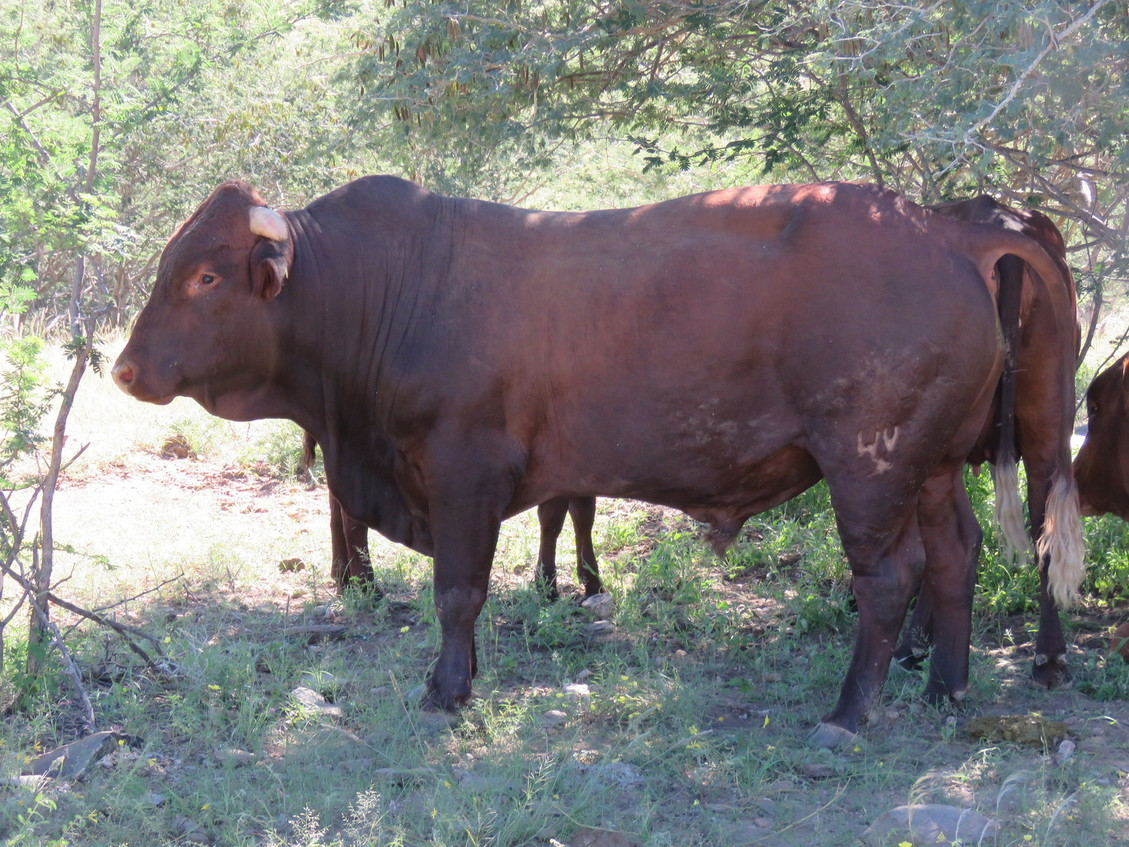
A Bonsmara bull in Namibia

The Bonsmara is a breed of cattle known for its high quality beef and resistance to local diseases. Originating in South Africa as a scientific experiment of professor Jan Bonsma, the Bonsmara was created after many cross matings and back-crosses consisting of five-eighths Afrikaner (Sanga-type), three-sixteenths Hereford, and three-sixteenths Shorthorn (both taurine types).

== See also ==
- Beef cattle
