= Reivilo =

- Location within North West (South African province) Location within South Africa
- Coordinates: 27°34′S 24°12′E
- Country: South Africa
- Province: North West
- District: Dr Ruth Segomotsi Mompati
- Municipality: Greater Taung

Area
  - Total: 4.57 km^{2} (1.76 sq mi)

Population (2011)
  - Total: 4,182
  - Density: 915/km^{2} (2,370/sq mi)

Racial makeup (2011)
  - Black African: 79.7%
  - Coloured: 13.9%
  - Indian/Asian: 0.4%
  - White: 5.1%
  - Other: 1.0%

First languages (2011)
  - Tswana: 78.0%
  - Afrikaans: 17.6%
  - English: 1.5%
  - Other: 2.9%
- Time zone: UTC+2 (SAST)
- Postal code (street): 8595
- PO box: 8595
- Area code: 053
- Website: tourismnorthwest.co.za

Reivilo is a town situated 100 km southwest of Vryburg on the Ghaap Plateau in North West Province of South Africa. Large scale lead and zinc mining took place in the district.

== History ==
The town was established in 1883 and at first named Cathcart West (to distinguish it from Cathcart, Eastern Cape). The name was then changed in 1890 to Klein Boetsap, and then finally it was renamed after Rev AJ Olivier (Olivier reversed is Reivilo).

== Economy ==
Reivilo is a traditional farming community. The main farming business is cattle, this is dictated by the geology of the area, because there is not enough arable soil for agriculture. Bedrock exists right to the ground surface, being an ancient and hard dolomite, with extraordinary stromatolitic features, representing life forms more than 2 billion years old. There was a successful cheese factory in Reivilo for many years.

In the very early 1980s Shell South Africa (Pty) Ltd developed a lead and zinc mine near Reivilo called Pering. It operated successfully for about 18 years and then closed down. Shell mined about 18 million tonnes of ore, containing perhaps 750,000 tonnes of zinc and lead metal from the Pering Mine during that time. At present there is no mining taking place near Reivilo.

The town today includes the Reivilo golf course to the north of the town, and a small aeroplane landing strip (IATA: RVO), to the north-west.
