= Gochas =

Village in Hardap, Namibia

- Village
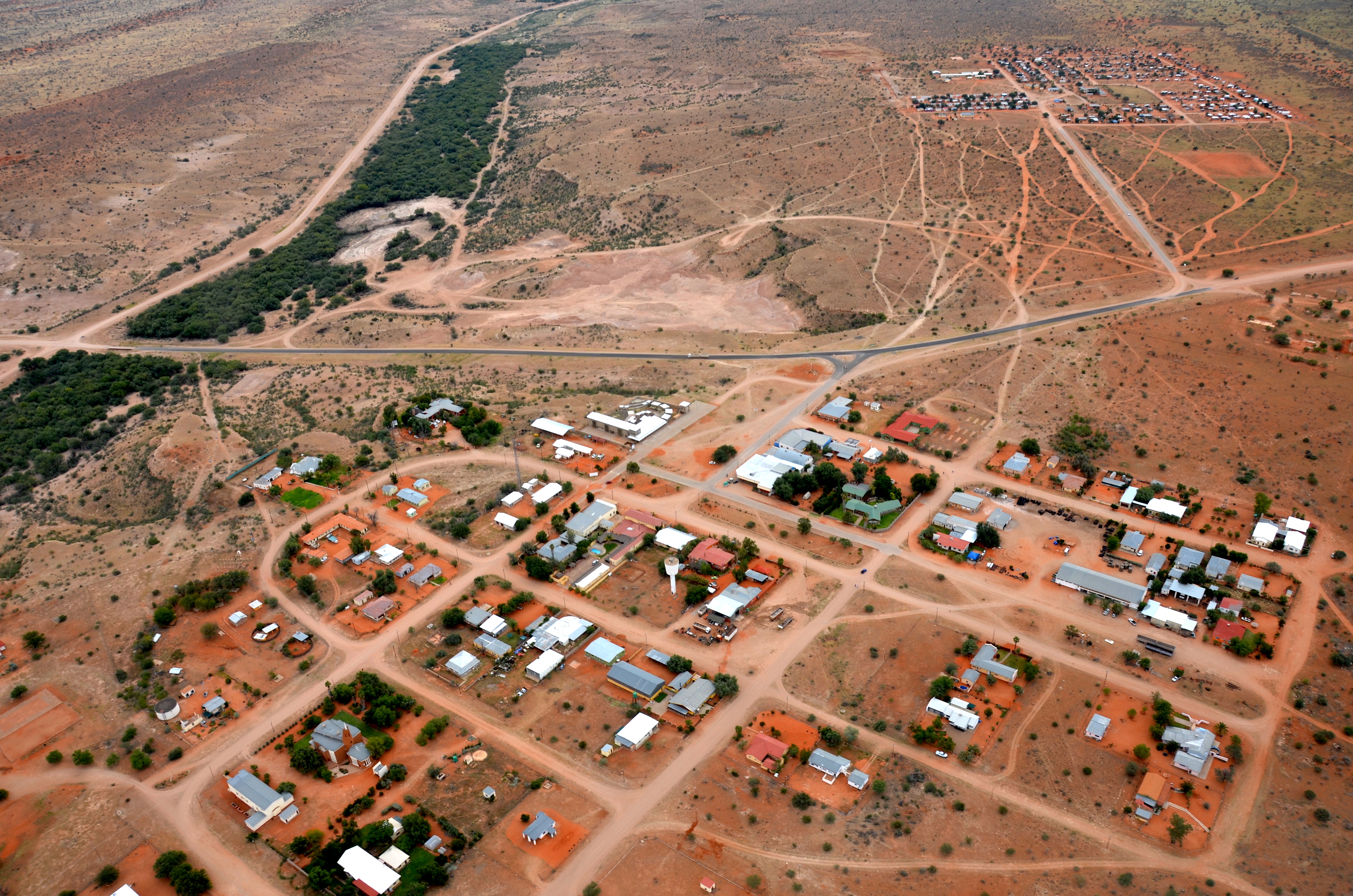
- Aerial view of Gochas (2017)

- Location within Namibia
- Coordinates: 24°47′S 18°49′E
- Country: Namibia

Population (2023)
  - Total: 1,868
- Time zone: UTC+2 (South African Standard Time)
- Climate: BWh

Gochas is a village in the Hardap Region of Namibia. The village had 1,868 inhabitants in 2023.

== History ==
The village has been the main settlement of the ǃKharakhoen (Fransman Nama), a subtribe of the Nama people, since 1889.

Gochas was a flashpoint in the colonial Herero Wars in German South West Africa. It was used as a military post and camel station under Imperial German rule. In January 1905 the Germans defeated the Nama chief Simon Kooper here. The final battle of the war, the Battle of Seatsub, was fought in Bechuanaland in March 1908. Capt. Friedrich von Erckert was killed in action, and a memorial was built in Gochas.

== Geography ==
Gochas is located 110 kilometres (68 mi) southeast of Mariental and 64 kilometres (40 mi) southwest of Stampriet on the way to the Mata Mata border post to the Kgalagadi Transfrontier Park. It lies on the banks of the Auob River 1,150 metres (3,770 ft) above sea level. The area is at the center of a set of Kalahari Desert dune farms on which cattle and sheep graze.

=== Demographics ===
In 1960, the population was reported as 205 whites, 108 mixed-race, and 224 blacks.

Historical population
| Year | Pop. | ±% p.a. |
|---|---|---|
| 1960 | 537 | — |
| 2011 | 1,347 | +1.82% |
| 2023 | 1,868 | +2.76% |

=== Climate ===
Gochas receives an average of 176 millimetres (6.9 in) of rainfall per year. During the 2010s drought a low of 31 mm (1.2 in) was recorded.

== Politics ==
Gochas is governed by a village council, established in 1958, that currently has five seats.

Upon Namibian independence Gochas was governed by a seven-seat village council. The first local election run after independence, the 1992 local elections, was won by SWAPO which obtained 245 votes and gained four seats. The Democratic Turnhalle Alliance (DTA) came second with 153 votes and three seats. The 1998 local authority elections saw a much narrower result. SWAPO again obtained four seats with 131 votes, DTA got the remaining thee seats with 118 votes.

The 2015 local authority election was won by SWAPO party which gained three seats (326 votes). One seat each was won by the Congress of Democrats (CoD, 96 votes) and the DTA (36 votes). The 2020 local authority election was won by the newly formed Landless People's Movement (LPM) which scored well all over Hardap. LPM gained 347 votes and three seats in the village council. SWAPO gained only one seat (147 votes), and the likewise new Independent Patriots for Change (IPC) won the remaining seat with 108 votes.
