= Blue lace agate =

Variety of agate with blue and white banding

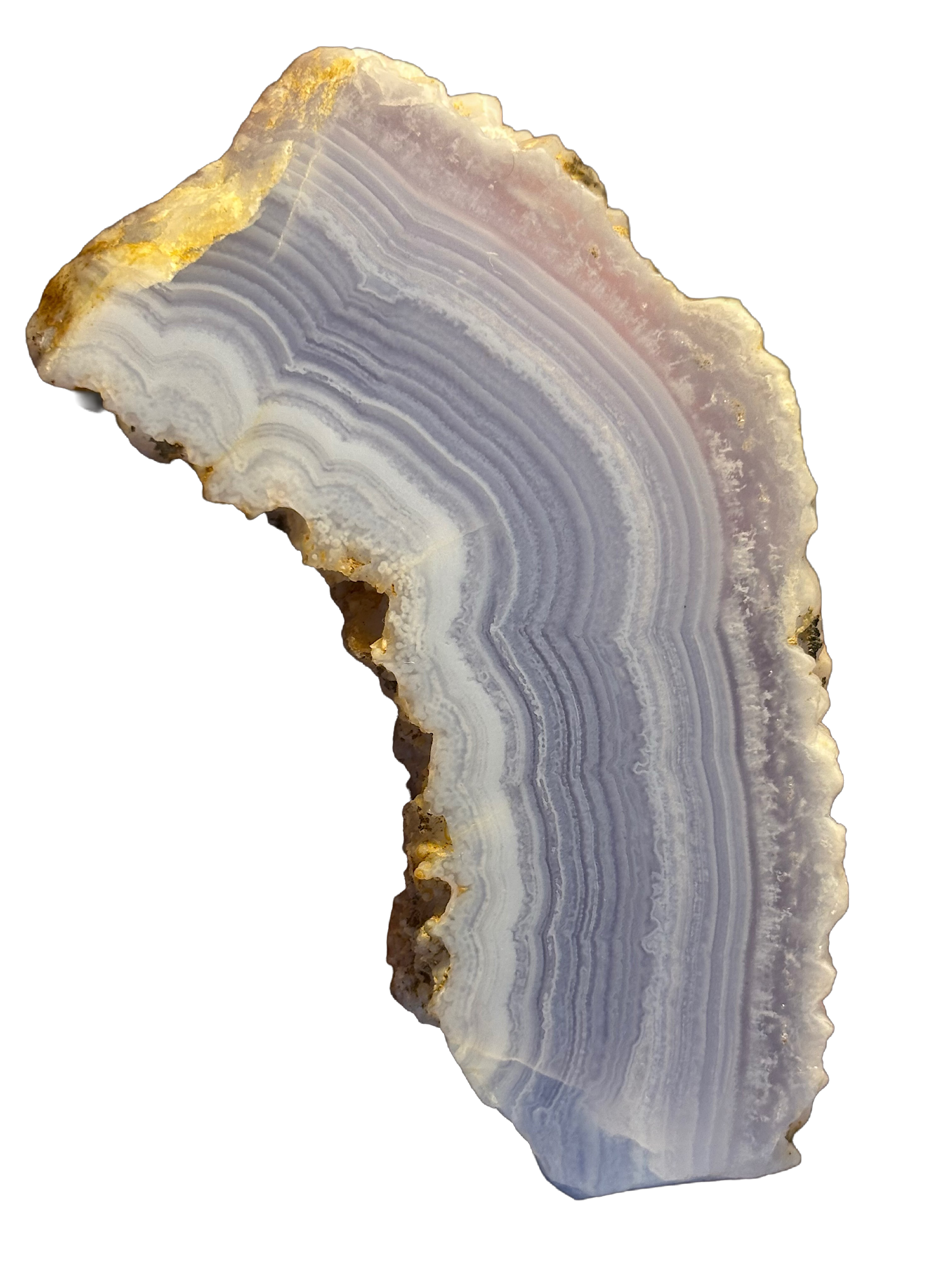
- Blue lace agate slab from Ysterputs Mine, ǁKaras Region, Namibia

General
- Category: Tectosilicate minerals
- Group: Quartz group
- Formula: SiO_{2} (silicon dioxide)
- IMA status: Variety of quartz (chalcedony)
- Crystal system: Trigonal (quartz) or monoclinic (moganite)

Identification
- Color: Pale blue, white
- Crystal habit: Cryptocrystalline silica
- Cleavage: None
- Fracture: Conchoidal, subconchoidal
- Tenacity: Brittle
- Mohs scale hardness: 6.5–7
- Luster: Waxy, vitreous when polished
- Streak: White
- Diaphaneity: Translucent to opaque
- Specific gravity: 2.6
- Density: 2.6 g/cm^{3}
- Optical properties: Uniaxial (+)
- Refractive index: 1.530–1.543
- Birefringence: Up to 0.004
- Pleochroism: Absent

Blue lace agate is an agate variety with pale blue and white, lace-patterned banding. Until 2017, its primary source was a single, now-defunct mine in Namibia, although similar material can be found elsewhere. Blue lace agate is a vein agate; in Namibia, it formed in dolerite of Jurassic age. It is used in lapidary as a semiprecious gemstone.

== Origin ==
The primary source of blue lace agate for several decades was the privately-owned Ysterputs Mine (also spelled Ysterputz) on Ysterputs Farm 254 in Karasburg West, ǁKaras Region, Namibia. The mine was owned by the late George Swanson and was in operation from 1962 until January 2017; as of December 2023 its future is uncertain. Most mineralogical data on blue lace agate originates from analysis of material from Ysterputs.

The geological formations at Ysterputs are not unique to this one location. Similar deposits can be found on nearby farms, and it is possible that there are other occurrences of blue lace agate in Namibia or neighboring South Africa that remain unexploited. Other regions have also produced blue lace agate or a similar blue chalcedony, including the Lapurr Range in Turkana County, Kenya, Georgia, Malawi, Zambia, and Turkey.

== Description ==
Blue lace agate has an overall color of pale or light blue. It has a wavy, lace-like pattern that consists primarily of blue, spherulitic chalcedony bands layered with bands of white, micro-granular quartz. Unlike most agates, the majority of the chalcedony in blue lace agate is the length-slow variety, quartzine; this suggests that it formed in fluids with a high salinity. Also present are bands and tiny clusters of angular, rhombohedral quartz crystals with thin chalcedony overgrowths, some of which are visible to the naked eye and have well-formed faces.

Blue lace agate often contains a central area of massive (unbanded) chalcedony or a central vug. The vugs are often lined with clear or blue druzy quartz crystals. Crystals of calcite, gypsum, siderite, or ankerite may also occur in the vugs or on the outer surfaces of the agate.

Rare cubic crystals of blue chalcedony up to 9 millimetres (0.35 in) in size have also been found in vugs and on plates at a single location in the Ysterputs Mine. While previously thought to be pseudomorphs after fluorite, they are likely pseudomorphs after melanophlogite.

The color of blue lace agate is believed to be due to Rayleigh scattering of light by tiny cavities, inclusions, or sub-microscopic particles of amorphous silica within the agate. In some specimens from Ysterputs, a fraction of the chalcedony bands appear fluorescent green under short-wave ultraviolet light due to trace amounts of uranyl ions.

== Geology ==
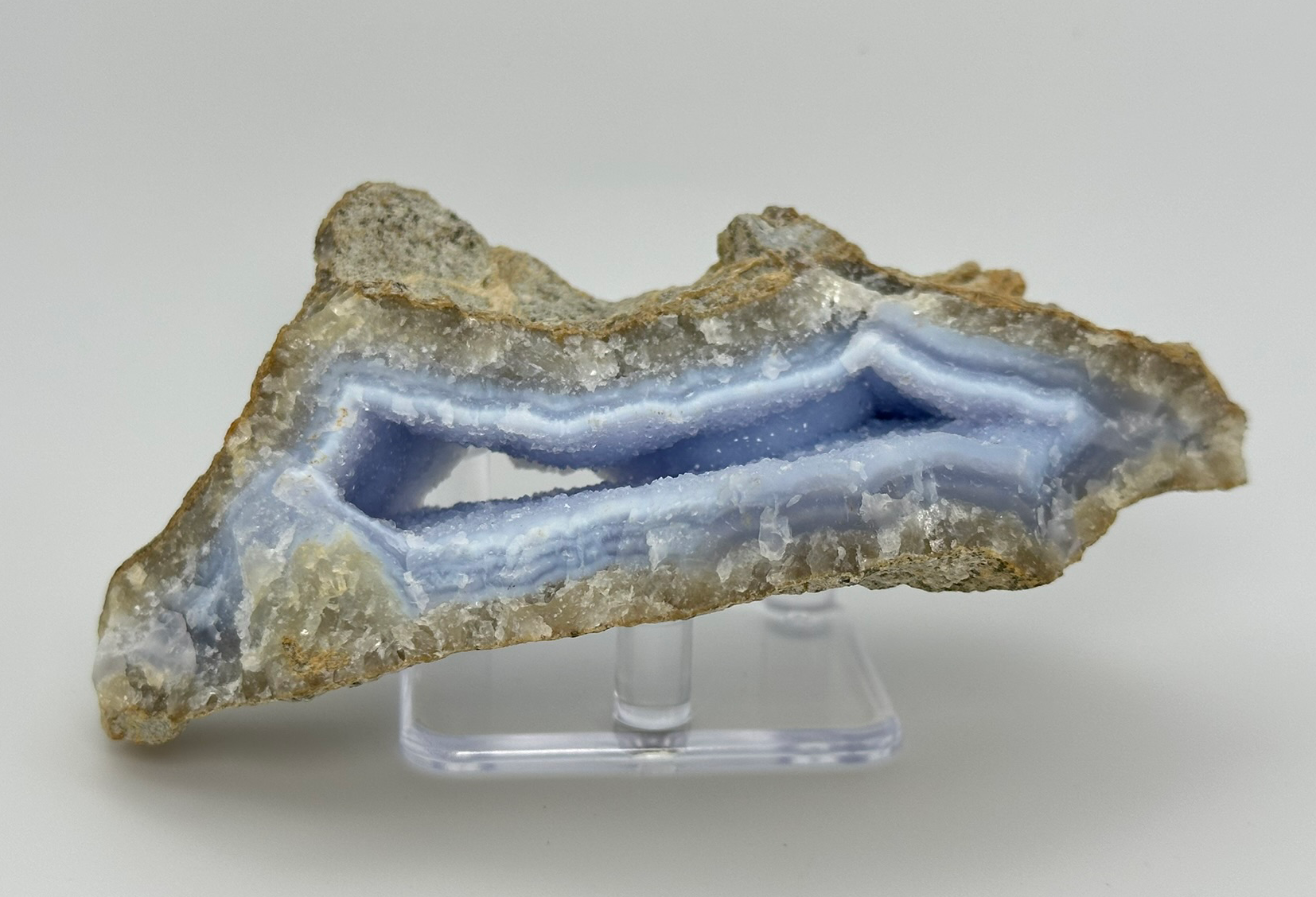
A cross section of a blue lace agate vein from Malawi, with a surrounding layer of pale green dolomite and a central vug coated with druzy quartz. Its resemblance to the veins described at Ysterputs indicates that it formed in a similar geological setting.

At Ysterputs, blue lace agate formed as hydrothermal vein deposits in the Tandjiesberg sill, an igneous intrusion of dolerite dating to the Jurassic period (roughly 183 million years ago). The sill intruded the Whitehill Formation shale of the Ecca Group, part of the Karoo Series of marine sedimentary rocks dating to the Permian period. The dolerite sill caused low-grade regional metamorphism of the surrounding shale and partial melting at its base. This created a hydrothermal system that carried a silica-rich, saline solution and volatiles from the underlying Karoo rocks into fractures in the sill resulting from a shear zone. The silica precipitated out of the solution in successive bands under varying conditions, forming the agate veins. The veins are typically 20–30 millimetres (0.79–1.18 in) thick or up to 60 millimetres (2.4 in) thick where the agate spans the whole width of the main fissure.

The color and thickness of the agate banding tends to be symmetrical on both sides of the fissure walls around a central plane. A layer of coarse, yellow-green dolomite, previously thought to be calcite, was deposited on the fissure walls prior to the agate and may still be attached in some specimens. Coating vugs in the agate veins is a smectite clay originating from weathered dolerite that has been previously identified as nontronite, although this could not be confirmed analytically. The clay is easily washed away with a pressure washer.

== Uses ==
Blue lace agate has been widely marketed as a lapidary material for jewelry and other aesthetic purposes. Particularly interesting specimens, such as those with crystal coatings or cubic chalcedony, are also sought after by mineral collectors.

== Gallery ==
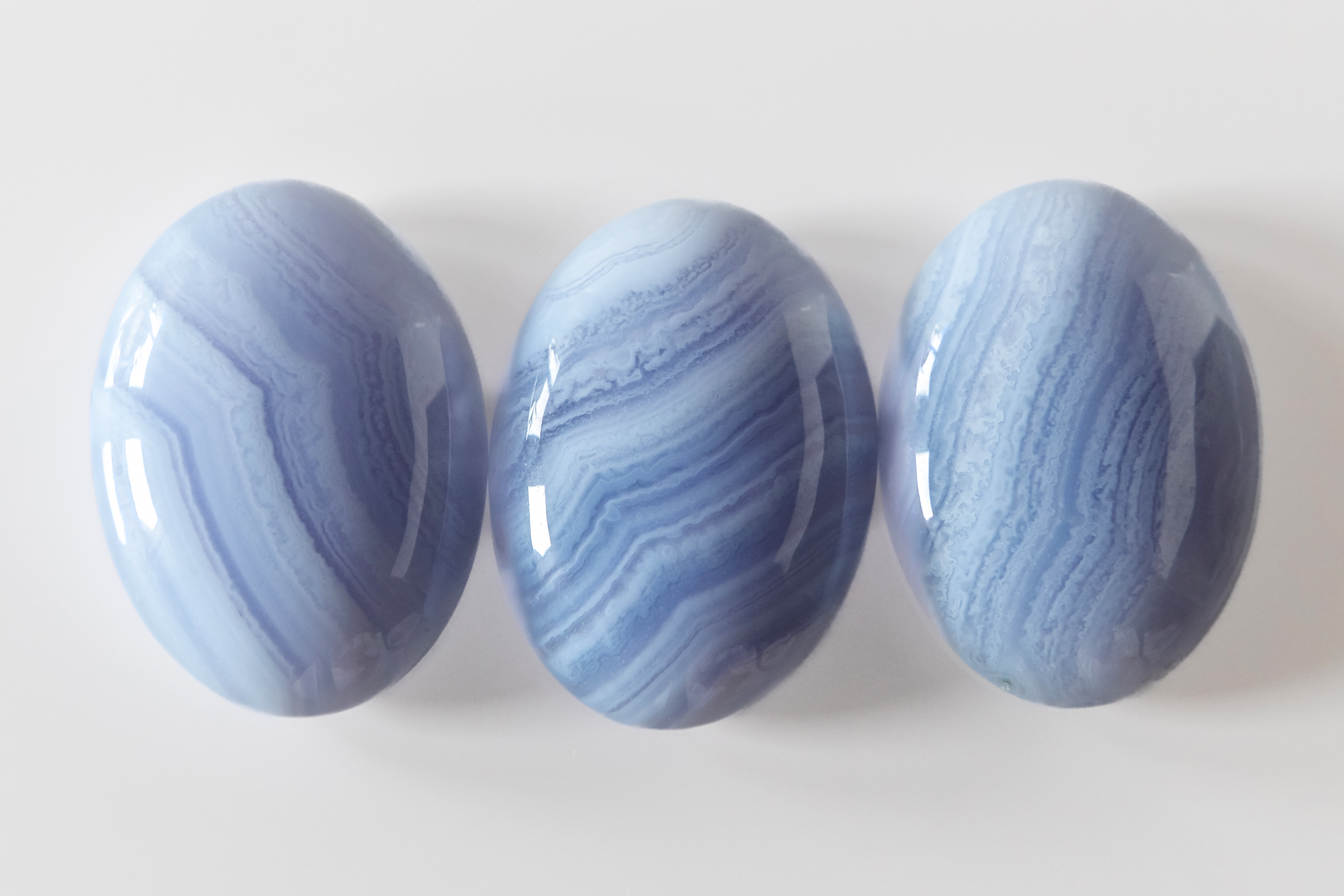
Blue lace agate cabochons

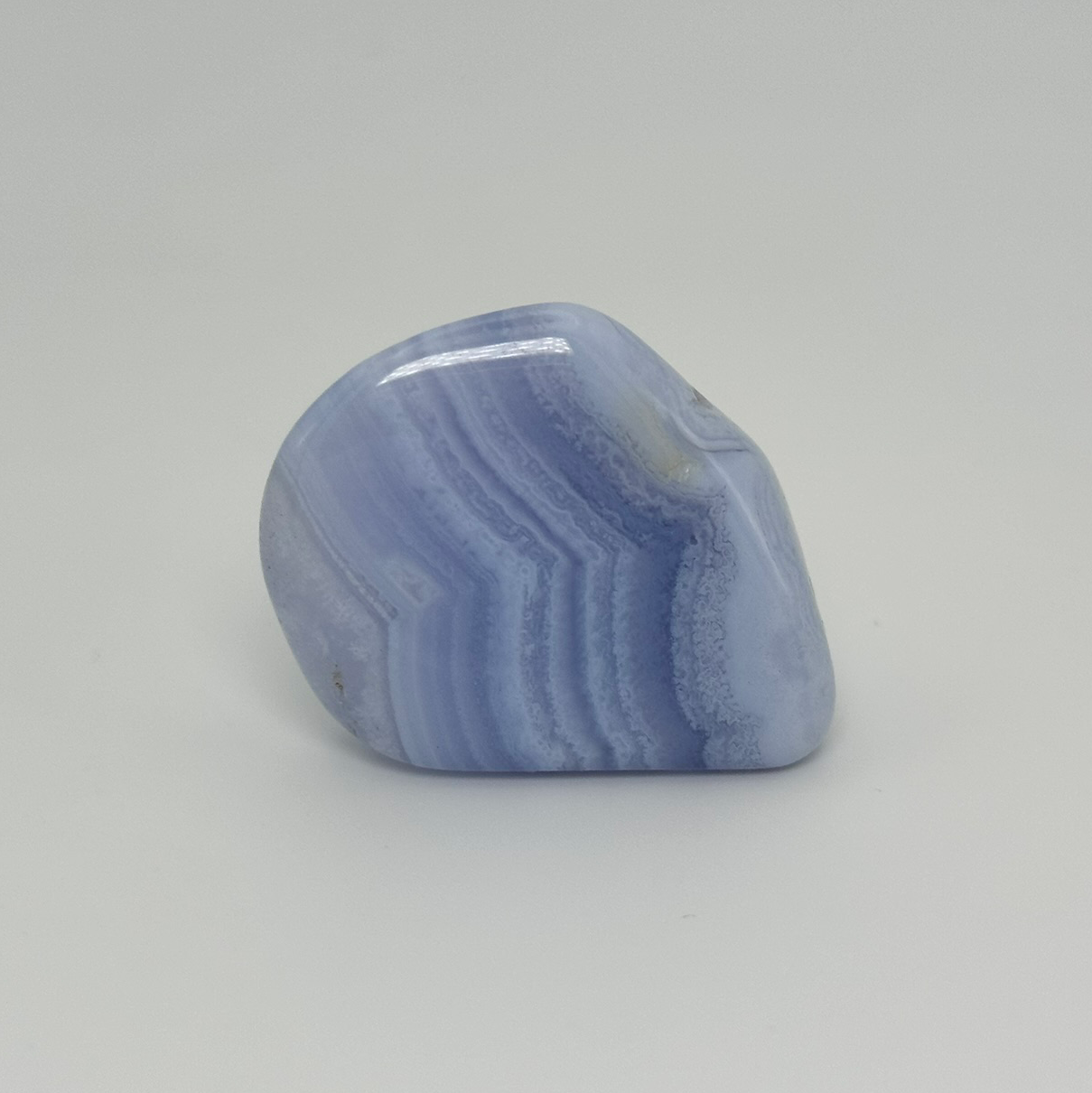
Tumbled blue lace agate

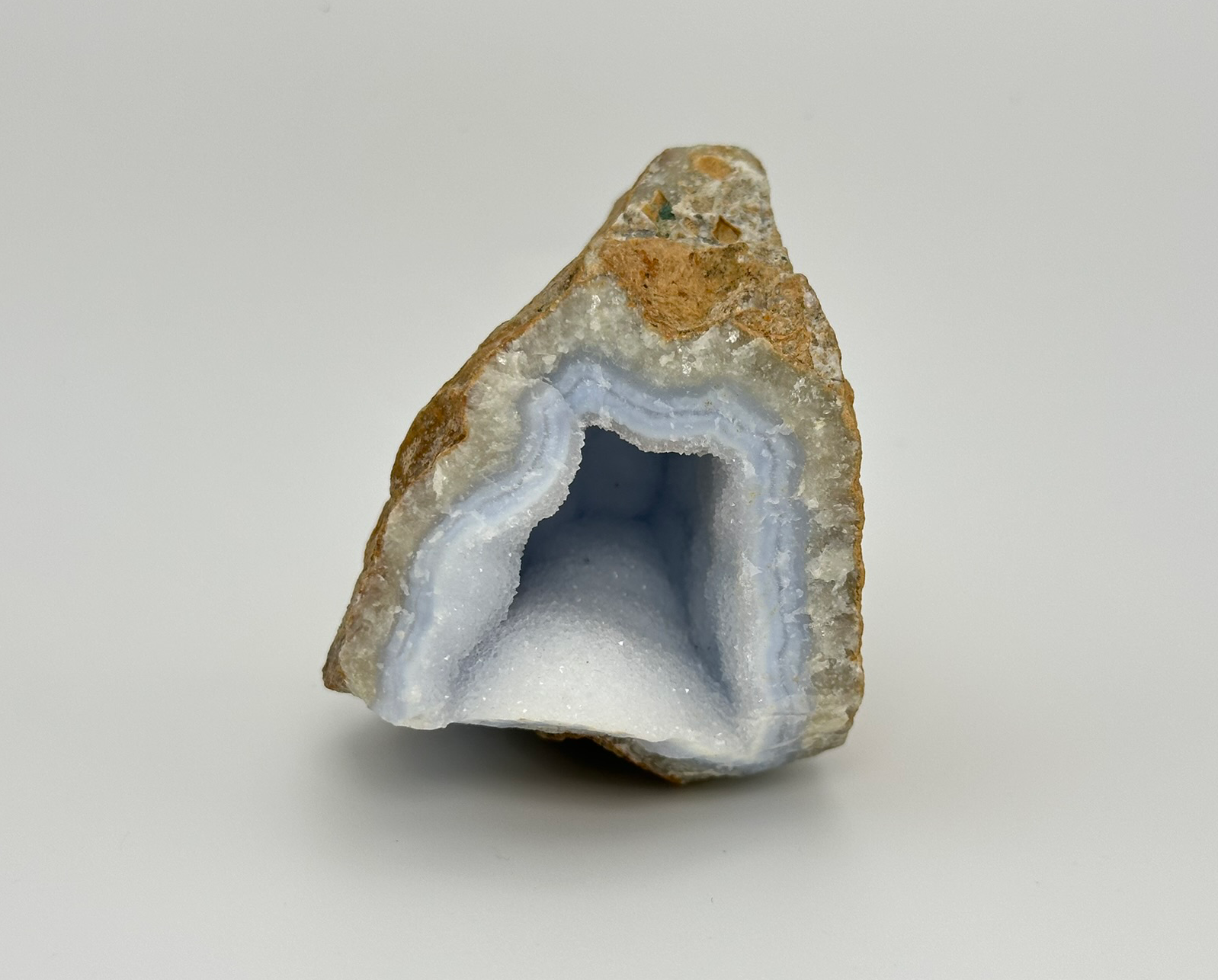
Blue lace agate "geode" (large vug with druzy quartz)

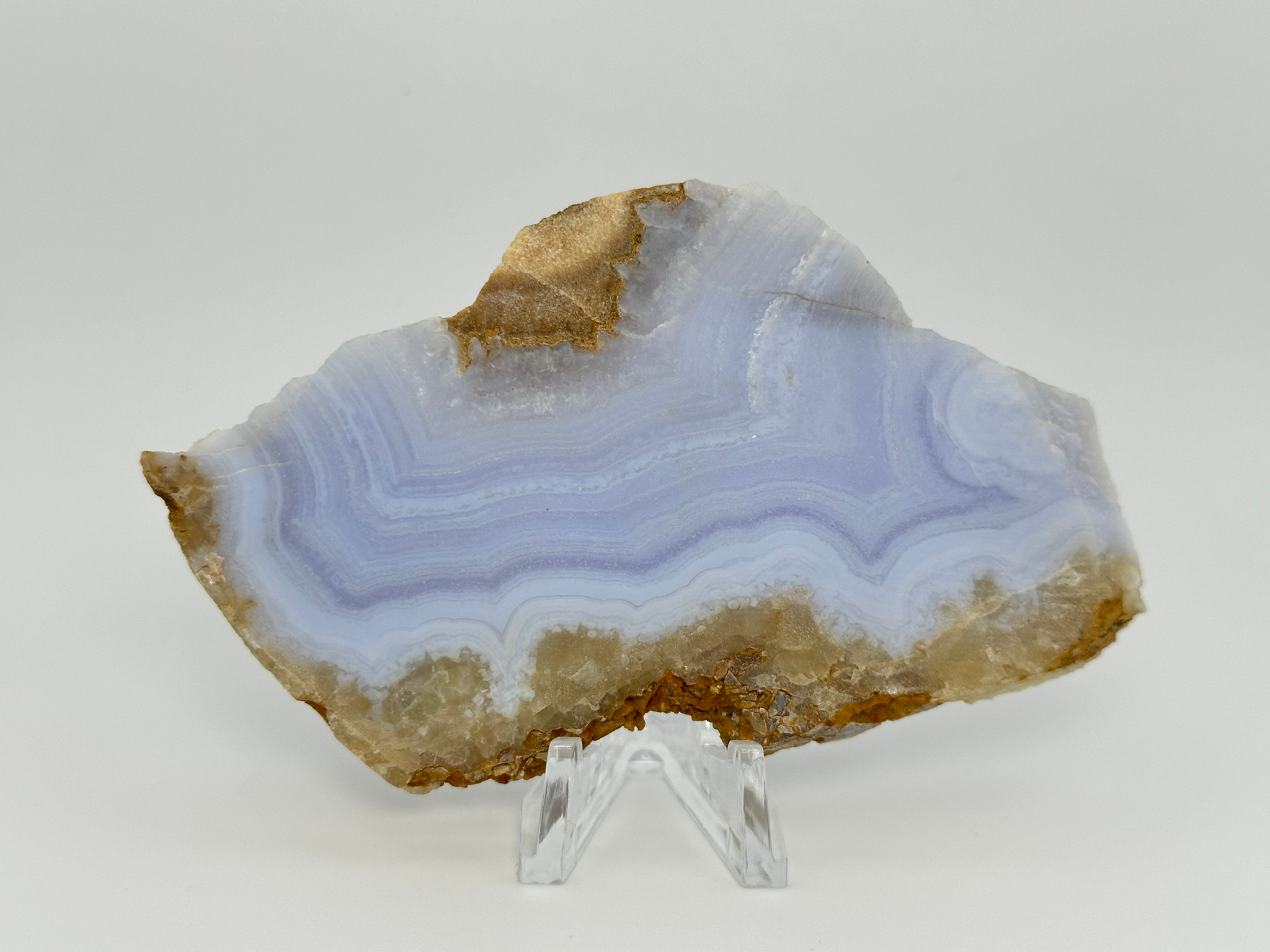
Unpolished slab of blue lace agate with green dolomite crystals (bottom)

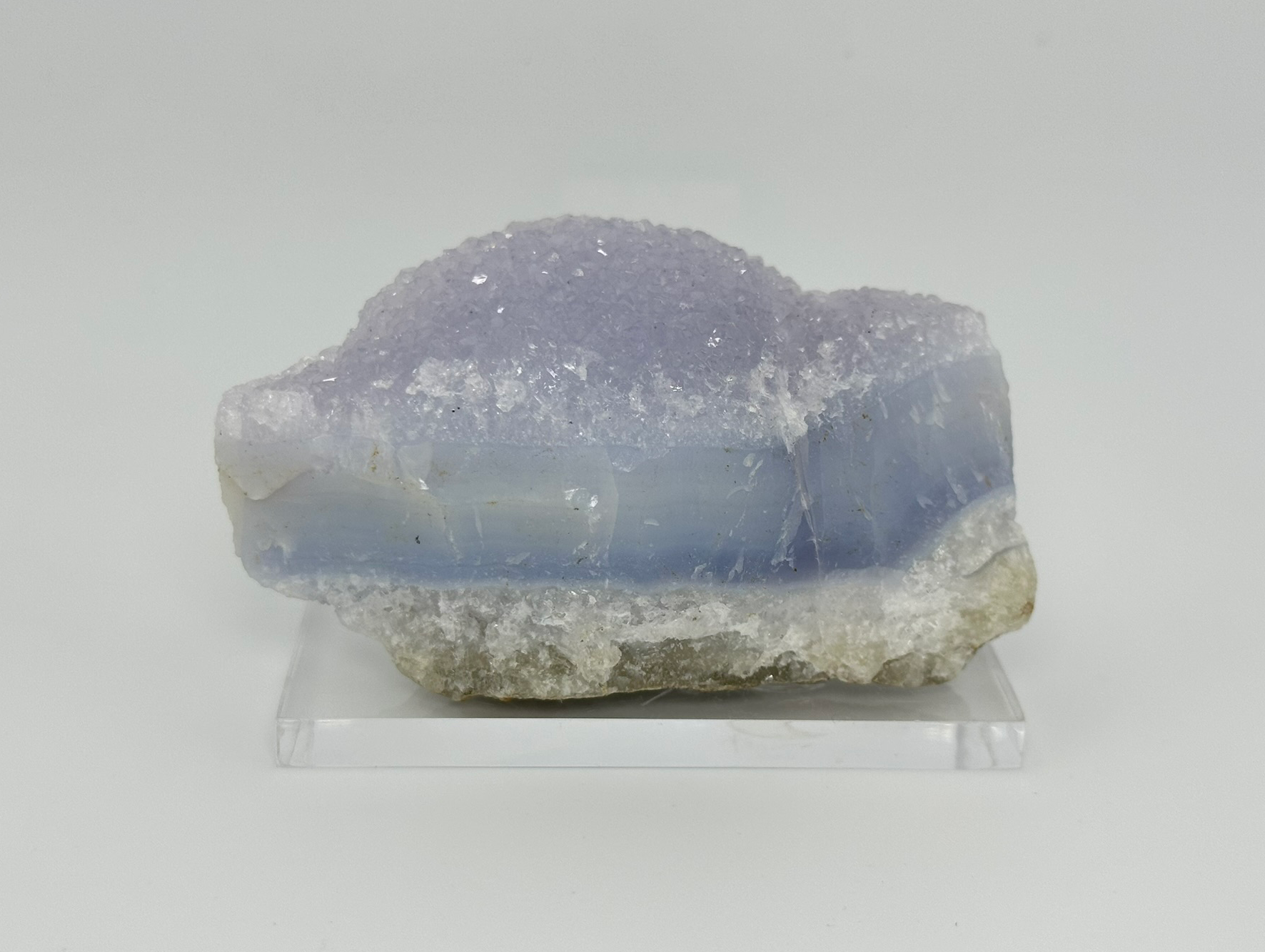
Blue lace agate with clear druzy quartz (top) and dolomite (bottom)

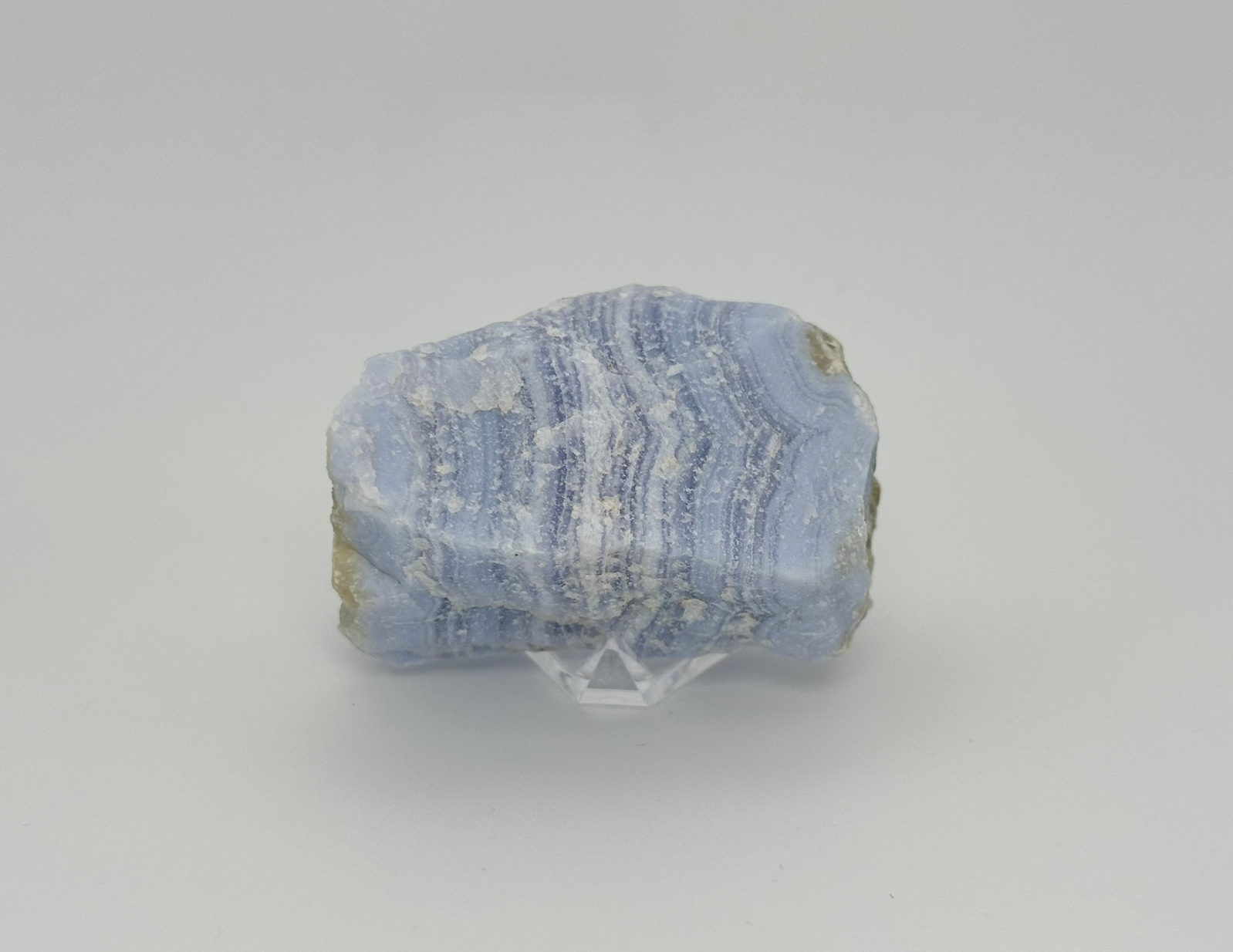
Rough chunk of blue lace agate
