= C37 road (Namibia) =

Secondary road in southern Namibia

C37 road

Major junctions
- South end: C13 north of Aussenkehr
- C10 east of ǀAi-ǀAis
- North end: C12 northwest of Grünau

Location
- Country: Namibia

Highway system
- Transport in Namibia
← C36	→ C38

The C37 is a secondary route in the ǁKaras Region of Namibia's remote South. It is 140 kilometres (87 mi) long, leading from Aussenkehr via ǀAi-ǀAis to the C12 54 kilometres (34 mi) northwest of Grünau.
