= C12 road (Namibia) =

Secondary route in Namibia

C12 road

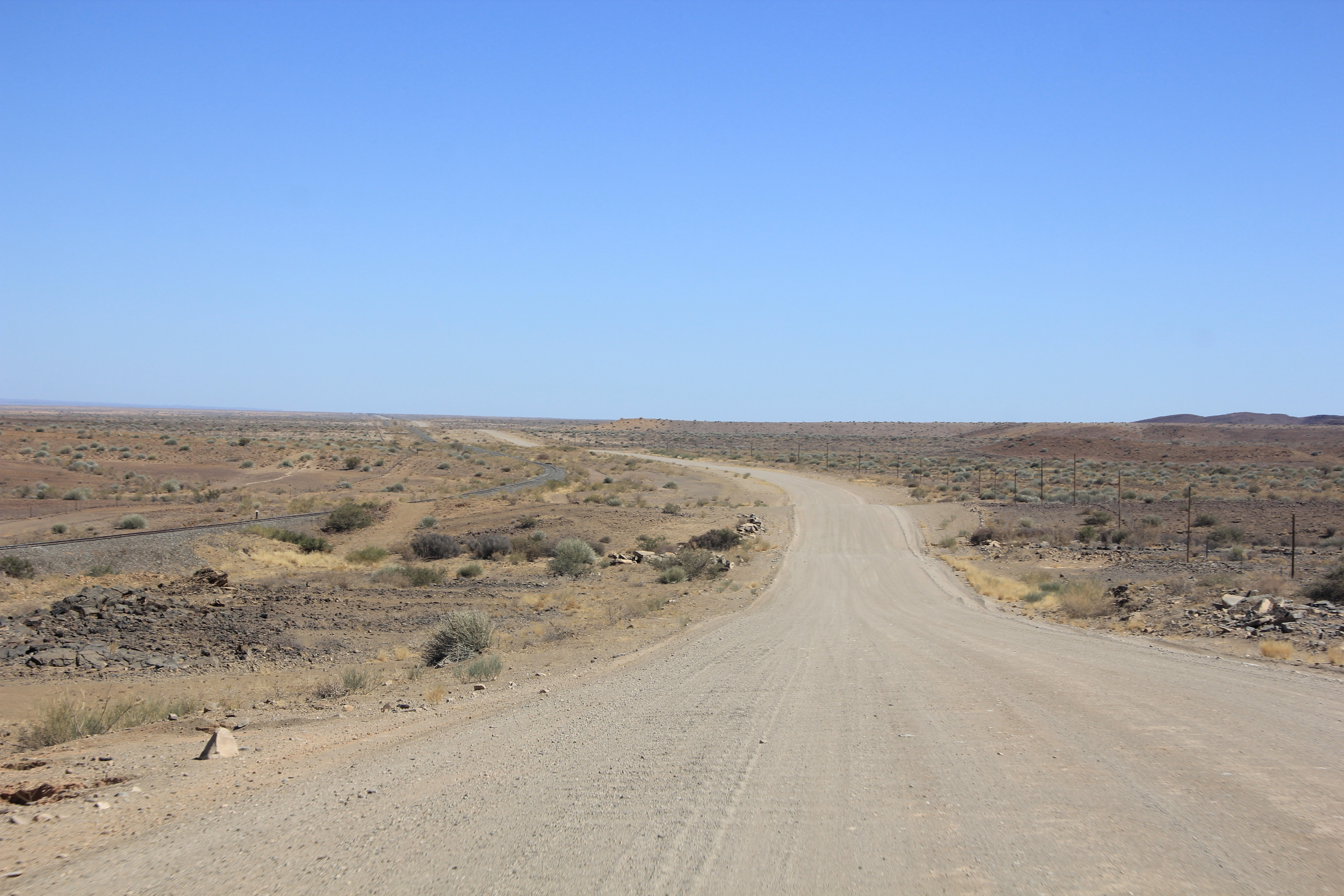
- The C12 in northern direction near Naute Dam

Major junctions
- South end: B1 at Grünau
- C37 near Holoog
- North end: B4 east of Seeheim

Location
- Country: Namibia

Highway system
- Transport in Namibia
← C11	→ C13

C12, also the MR 28, is an untarred secondary road in the ǁKaras Region of southern Namibia. It starts 15 kilometres (9.3 mi) east of Seeheim, branching off the B4 road, passes the Naute Dam, and ends 135 kilometres (84 mi) later in Grünau. In Grünau, the B1 and B3 roads can be accessed. Close to its junction with the C37 the C12 crosses the Holoog River. A planned bridge was never built.

Until 2014 the C12 started directly at the Seeheim junction off the B4 and went due south. Due to frequent flooding of this road section, the first 20 kilometres (12 mi) of this road were deproclaimed, and the entrance was fenced off. Traffic was redirected via Naute Dam. As the original road section still provides access to local farms, it can still be used, bypassing the blocking fence. Tourists are commonly warned against using this section.
