= Karasburg Constituency =

Coordinates: 28°01′S 18°45′E

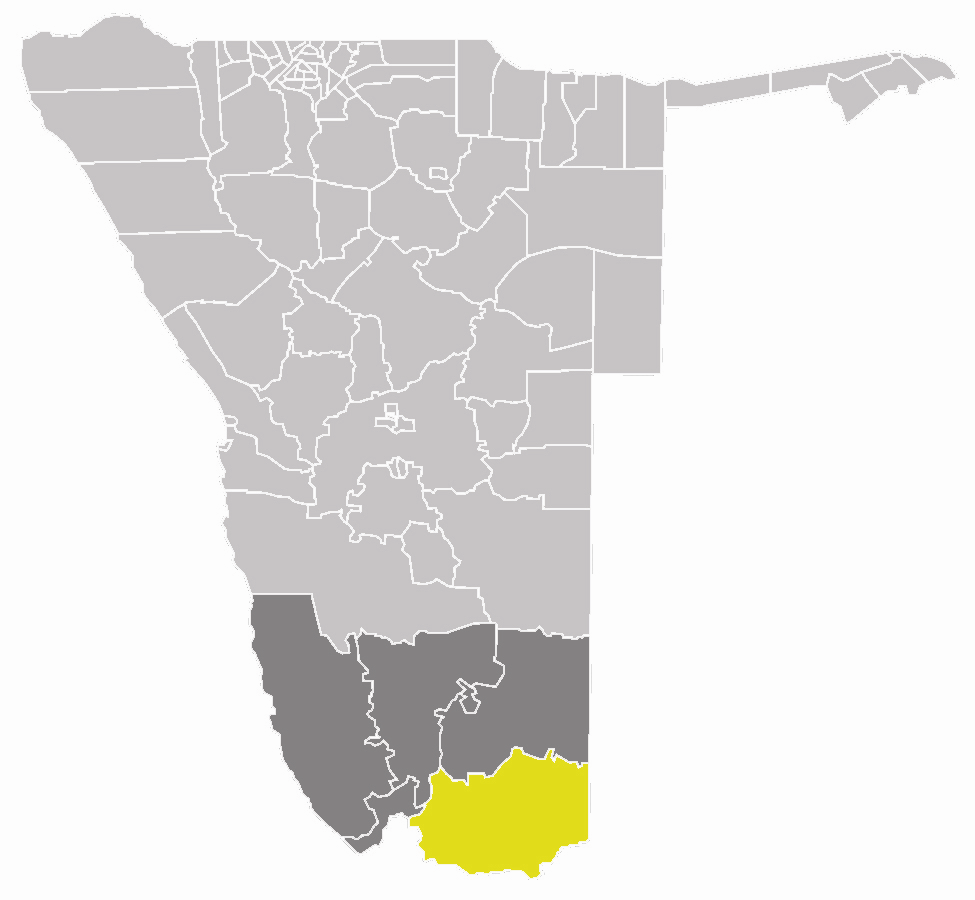
former Karasburg constituency (yellow) in the ǁKaras Region (dark grey) of southern Namibia

Karasburg was an electoral constituency in the ǁKaras Region of Namibia. It had a population of 16,470 in 2011, up from 15,758 in 2001. The constituency covered an area of 38,329 km^{2} (14,799 sq mi). The main towns were Karasburg and Grünau; other populated places included Warmbad and Aussenkehr, and the border settlements of Ariamsvlei and Noordoewer. The Orange River formed part of the southern border of this constituency. Economic activities in this constituency were mainly small-stock farming, and near the Orange River, grape production.

In 2013, the constituency was divided into two sections: Karasburg East and Karasburg West

== Politics ==
Karasburg Constituency was traditionally a stronghold of the South West Africa People's Organization (SWAPO) party. In the 2004 regional election, SWAPO candidate Paulus Amukoshi Ephraim received 2,157 of the 3,552 votes cast and became councillor.

Councillor Ephraim (SWAPO) was reelected in the 2010 regional elections with 1,577 votes. His defeated challengers were Desmund Desiderius Andreas of the Rally for Democracy and Progress (839 votes) and Irene Margaret Loberloth of the Democratic Party of Namibia (364 votes).
