= Aussenkehr =

- Settlement
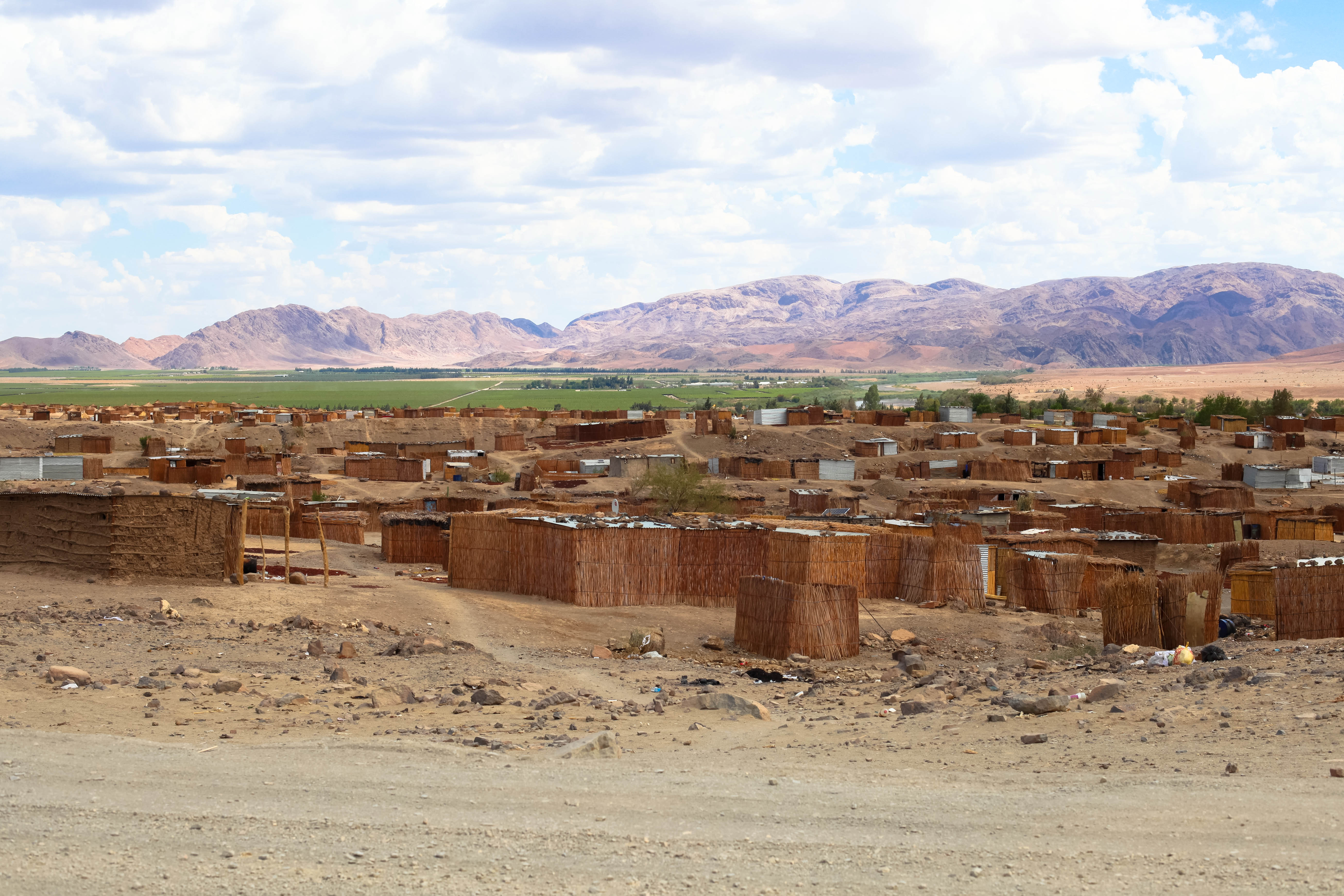
- Settlement Aussenkehr

- Location in Namibia
- Coordinates: 28°21′S 17°24′E
- Country: Namibia
- Region: ǁKaras Region
- Constituency: Karasburg Constituency
- Established: 1988
- Time zone: UTC+2 (South African Standard Time)

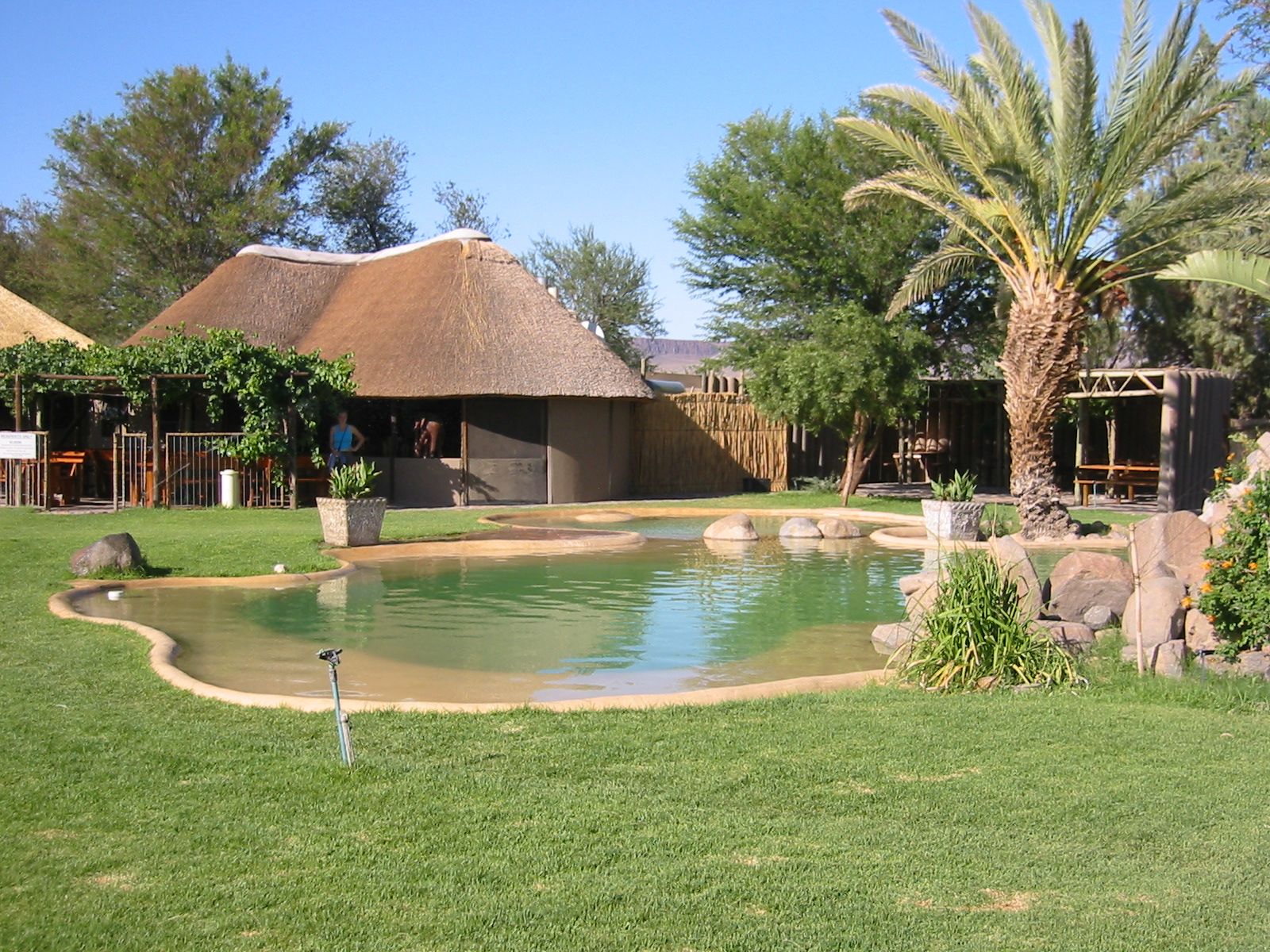
Norotshama River Resort

Aussenkehr (German: Outer bend, referring to the flow of the Orange at this location) is a farm and a settlement on the banks of the Orange River in the south of Namibia right on the border with South Africa. Aussenkehr falls within the Karasburg Constituency of the ǁKaras Region and is situated 24 kilometres (15 mi) downstream (northwest) of Noordoewer. Aussenkehr was established as a farm in 1910 when an Imperial German investment corporation acquired the land and started several irrigation projects. Over time, Aussenkehr has evolved into a large settlement accommodating workers employed nearby. Estimations of how many people live here vary between 7,000 and 30,000.

The settlement features a government clinic and a primary school. Plans are in place to develop Aussenkehr into a town. 6,000 erven have been surveyed and water and sewerage systems have been built, but the construction of houses on the delineated plots has not yet started. Many residents have no access to safe drinking water and sanitation. Instead, they use the river both for water supply and as toilet. Living conditions in the settlement have been described as "appalling".

Serbian immigrant Dušan Vasiljević bought the farm Aussenkehr in 1988 to develop grape production, after a previous, similar project had failed. The area receives less than 50 millimetres (2.0 in) average annual rainfall, but the farm includes 15 kilometres (9.3 mi) of riverfront and has a government-approved quota to draw water for irrigation from the Orange River. The Norotshama River Resort is located on the farm as a tourism venture.

The extreme climatic conditions—summer temperatures can reach 50 °C (122 °F) in the river valley—provide the area with an advantage over other grape producers, as Aussenkehr's table grapes can be harvested three to five weeks earlier than elsewhere. The extremely dry conditions also mean that the farmers need fewer pesticides.

The farms produced 1,000 tonnes (1,100 short tons) of grapes in 1991 on 150 hectares (370 acres) of irrigated land. In 2003, production increased to 12,000 tonnes (13,000 short tons). Currently there are 2,000 hectares (4,900 acres) under irrigation for the purpose of grape production.
