= Lucia Basson =

Namibian politician (born 1953)

- Born: 20 March 1953 (age 73); Karasburg, ǁKaras Region
- Citizenship: Namibian
- Occupation: Politician
- Title: Governor
- Term: 5 years
- Political party: SWAPO

Lucia Basson (born 20 March 1953 in Karasburg, ǁKaras Region) is a Namibian politician who has been the governor of the ǁKaras Region of Namibia from April 2015 to April 2020. A member of SWAPO, Basson was a member of the National Assembly of Namibia from being chosen for the SWAPO electoral list by President Sam Nujoma in 2005 until 2010, when she narrowly missed re-election. She is a SWAPO leader from the Hardap Region.

== Personal life ==
Basson is active in gender equality, land reform, and community development initiatives. She is known for her advocacy on behalf of rural Namibians.
