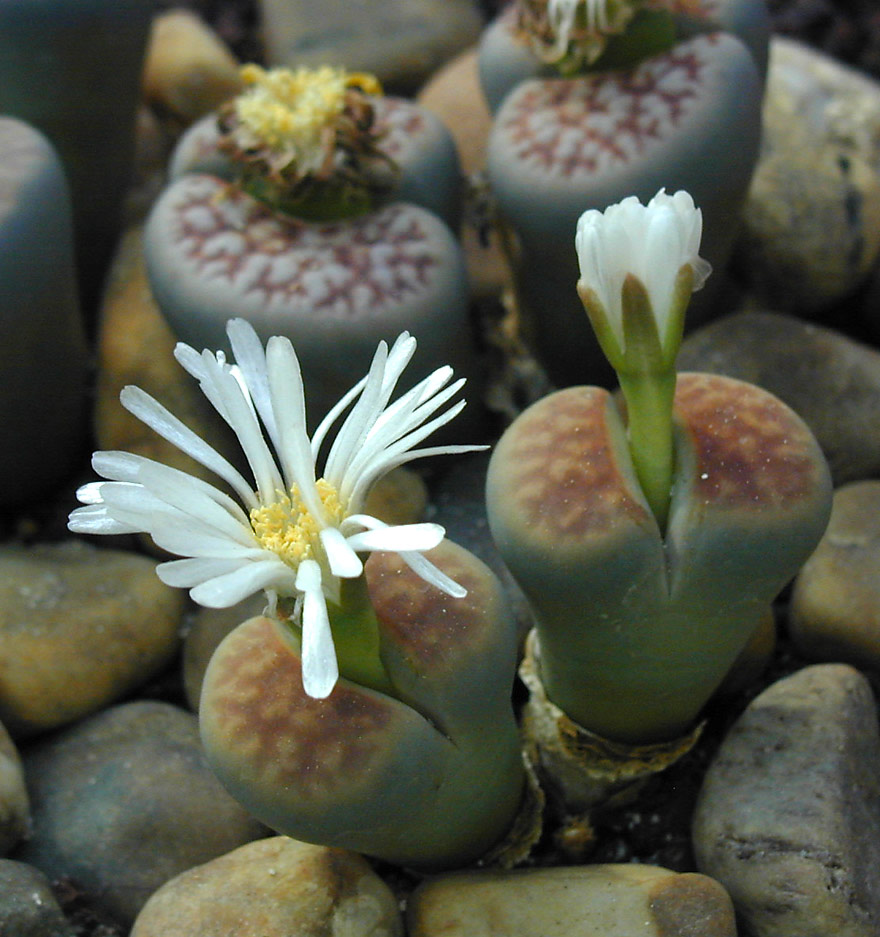
- L. karasmontana

Scientific classification
- Kingdom: Plantae
- Clade: Embryophytes
- Clade: Tracheophytes
- Clade: Angiosperms
- Clade: Eudicots
- Order: Caryophyllales
- Family: Aizoaceae
- Genus: Lithops
- Species: L. karasmontana

Binomial name
- Lithops karasmontana (Dinter & Schwantes) N.E.Br.

= Lithops karasmontana =

Species of succulent

Lithops karasmontana, is a species of flowering plant in the ice plant family Aizoaceae, native to Namibia and South Africa (the name refers to the Great Karas Mountains of Namibia).

== Description ==
It is a clump-forming succulent growing to 4 cm (2 in) high and spreading. The almost stemless leaves appear in pairs, and resemble two grey stones with brown mottling on the flat surfaces. White, narrow-rayed flowers 3–4 cm (1–2 in) in diameter, appear in autumn.

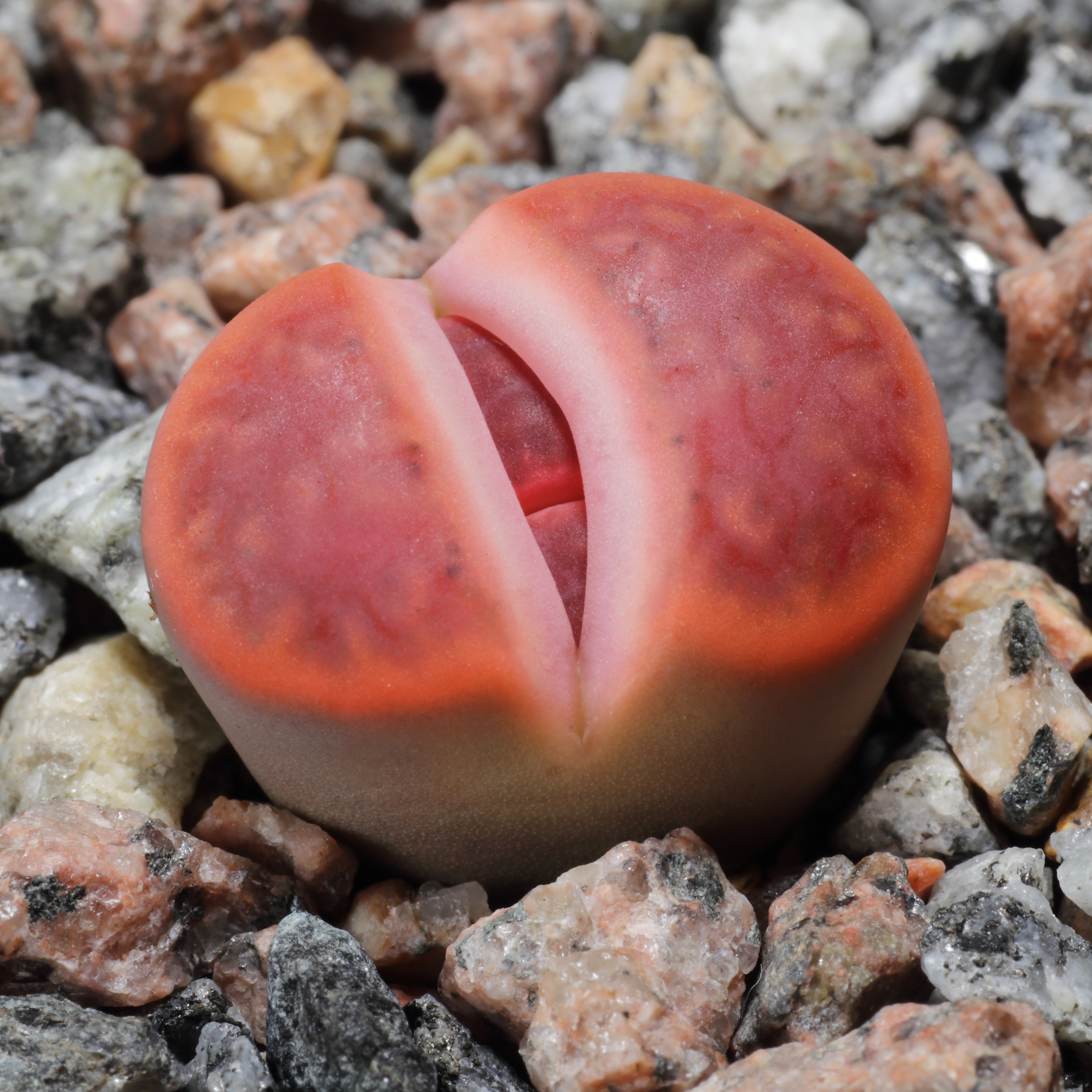
L. karasmontana var. lericheana, showing a new leaf-pair emerging to replace the old one

Lithops karasmontana resists attacks from herbivorous predators by mimicking the local stone formations, in this case quartzite. When not in flower it is extremely difficult to detect.

L. karasmontana is generally treated as having two subspecies bella and eberlanzii, as well as ssp. karasmontana, although one modern paper raises the two subspecies to species level on the basis of seed morphology. Ssp. bella is distinguished by its relatively uniform appearance with beige colouring and darker windows. It often forms very large clumps with up to 60 heads. Ssp. eberlanzii is much more variable in appearance, with colours and markings similar to ssp. karasmontana, but it is generally smaller, softer, and more convex.

Four varieties are also recognised: var. aiaisensis with creamy pinkish colouring, relative or complete lack of markings, and fairly smooth leaves; var. immaculata with almost unmarked beige leaves; var. lericheana with wide channels and greenish colouring; and var. tischeri with convex leaf tops and reddish colouring. Many older names are now sunk as synonyms in this highly variable species.

== Cultivars ==
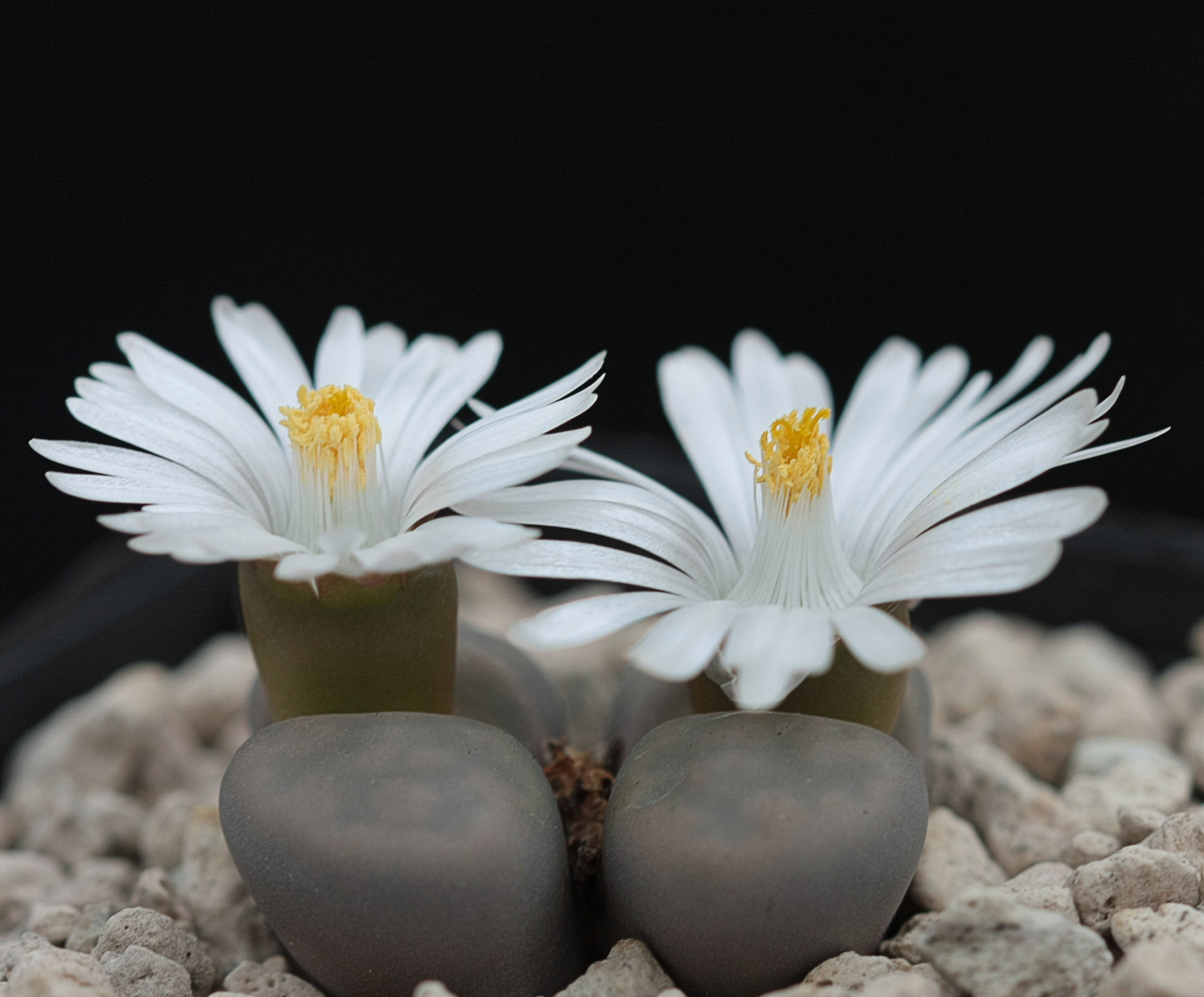
Lithops karasmontana 'Opalina'

There are, as of 2023, 18 named cultivars of Lithops karasmontana:

- '50 Shades of Gray', with "pale plant bodies, honeycomb humps and dark condensed windows"
- 'Avocado Creme', a pale green form of ssp. eberlanzii
- 'Axel's Rose', red-bodied plants
- 'Cascade', a variegated ssp. bella
- 'Cookie', plants with orange tops and dark markings
- 'De Boer's Mick', with intense red markings
- 'Ironstone', ssp. bella with plain open windows
- 'Karasbijin', pale bodies with dark flecks
- 'Lateritia', with intense red to orange plain tops
- 'Lava Flow', a hybrid between var. tischeri and var. lericheana
- 'Lerichegreen', a green form of var. lericheana
- 'Mado-Shugengyoku', var. lericheana with a pinkish body and plain brown leaf tops
- 'Opalina', an unintentional publication as a cultivar of the plant originally published as L. opalina
- 'Orange Ice', var. aiaisensis with a strongly orange top
- 'Purper', a purple-bodied ssp. eberlanzii
- 'Rosary', plants with deformed leaves and an unusual growth habit
- 'Sunstone', a hybrid between ssp. bella and ssp. karasmontana
- 'Top Red', plants with a bright red network of channels

== Cultivation ==
In temperate regions it must be grown in heat under glass, in conditions similar to those for cactuses. Like all Lithops, it requires extremely well-drained soil.

Like all Lithops it also grows in annual cycles, as the leaf-pairs flower, and then each produces a new leaf-pair that replaces the old one (which shrivels away). The principal rule of watering is that Lithops should be kept dry from when they finish flowering, until the old leaf-pairs are fully replaced. It has gained the Royal Horticultural Society's Award of Garden Merit.
