= Bondels Dam =

Reservoir in ǁKaras Region, Namibia

- Country: Namibia
- Status: Operational
- Opening date: 1959

Bondels Dam is a reservoir outside of Karasburg in the ǁKaras Region of Namibia. Located 7 km west of Karas, it dams the Obub River and was built to enhance the recharge of the Bondels Dam aquifer. It has a capacity of 1.105 million cubic metres and was completed in 1959 while Namibia was known as South West Africa.
