= Ida Hoffmann =

Namibian politician (born 1947)

Ida Maria Magdalena Hoffmann
- Born: September 16, 1947 (age 78); Karasburg
- Title: Honorable
- Political party: Swapo Party of Namibia

Ida Maria Magdalena Hoffmann (born 16 September 1947 in Karasburg, ǁKaras Region) is a Namibian politician. She served as a member of the 6th National Assembly from 2015 to 2020. Prior to that, from 2005 to 2010 she was selected by president Hifikepunye Pohamba as a non-voting member of the 4th National Assembly of Namibia. Hoffman was active in SWAPO in the 1980s. After release from prison, she founded the Children's World Creche in Katutura in 1984 and has been involved in the Roman Catholic Church since 1962. In 1990, Hoffman studied project development at the Pan African Institute for Development in Zambia. She has also served as chairperson of the Nama Genocide Technical Committee in Windhoek.
