= Haib mine =

Copper mine in Karasburg West, ǁKaras, Namibia

- Location within Namibia
- Location: Karasburg West, ǁKaras Region, Namibia; 28.697°S 17.887°E
- Products: Copper; Molybdenum
- Company: Deep-South Resources Inc
- Website: www.deepsouthresources.com/projects/haib-copper/

The Haib mine is a proposed copper mine located in the south of Namibia in the ǁKaras Region. Haib represents one of the largest copper reserves in Namibia, having estimated reserves of 2 billion tonnes of ore grading 0.37% copper. The mine is accessible by an 12km access road off the B1 road.

The mine is owned by the Canada-based Deep-South Resources, Inc., through its subsidiary, Haib Minerals. Deep-South finished acquiring the mine in 2017 from Teck Resources, in exchange for Teck owning a 35% stake in Deep-South. As of 2021, the mine is in the prospecting stage, with the Supreme Court of Namibia ruling that the company could renew its permit.
