= John Walters (lawyer) =

Namibian lawyer (born 1956)

John Robert Walters (born 7 July 1956) is a retired Namibian lawyer, serving as ombudsman from 2004 to 2021.

== Early life and education ==
Walters, a Namibian Coloured by descent, was born on 7 July 1956 in Karasburg, South West Africa. From 1971 he attended Dr Lemmer High School in Rehoboth from which he obtained matric in 1974. He wanted to study medicine but failed to obtain the special permit that was necessary during apartheid for a person of color to study at a Whites-only university. He eventually settled for law studies at the University of the Western Cape (UWC) in Cape Town, South Africa, which was a tertiary education institution for colored people but did not have a school of medicine.

Walters started tertiary education in 1975, and in 1980 graduated with an LLB from UWC.

== Career ==
In 1981 Walters started working as a prosecutor in the Keetmanshoop magistrate court. In 1985 he was appointed magistrate in Windhoek, and in 1990 he was appointed state prosecutor in the Office of the Prosecutor General. He was only the second non-White admitted as lawyer in South West Africa. Walters worked in the private sector from 1996 until he became acting prosecutor general in 2002. In July 2004 he became Namibia's third ombudsman, a position he held until his retirement in 2021. On 1 October his successor Basilius Dyakugha was appointed.

Walters served as vice president of the International Ombudsman Institute in 2012, and as president in 2014, achievements that he regards "the highest accolade of my career".

== Private life ==
Walters is married to Althia. He has four brothers and three sisters.

He was an active rugby player in his youth, starting at Dr Lemmer High School in 1973. Soon known as "Big John" due to his physical size, and playing in the lock position, Walters continued to play at the University of the Western Cape, winning the regional Tygerberg Rugby Union league, and subsequently the South African Rugby Cup, in 1978. He was captain of his university team. After completion of his studies he played for Windhoek's Western Suburbs club. After his active rugby career he became the first vice-president of the Namibia Rugby Union (NRU) upon its foundation in 1990. He only served for one year. Walters also served on the board of the Namibia Sports Commission.
