= Karasburg railway station =

Railway station in Namibia

Coordinates: 28°1′3″S 18°44′47″E

Karasburg railway station is a railway station serving the town of Karasburg in southern Namibia. It is part of the TransNamib Railway, and is located along the Windhoek to Upington line that connects Namibia with South Africa.
