= Great Karas Mountains =

Mountain range in Namibia

Coordinates: 27°11′S 18°44′E

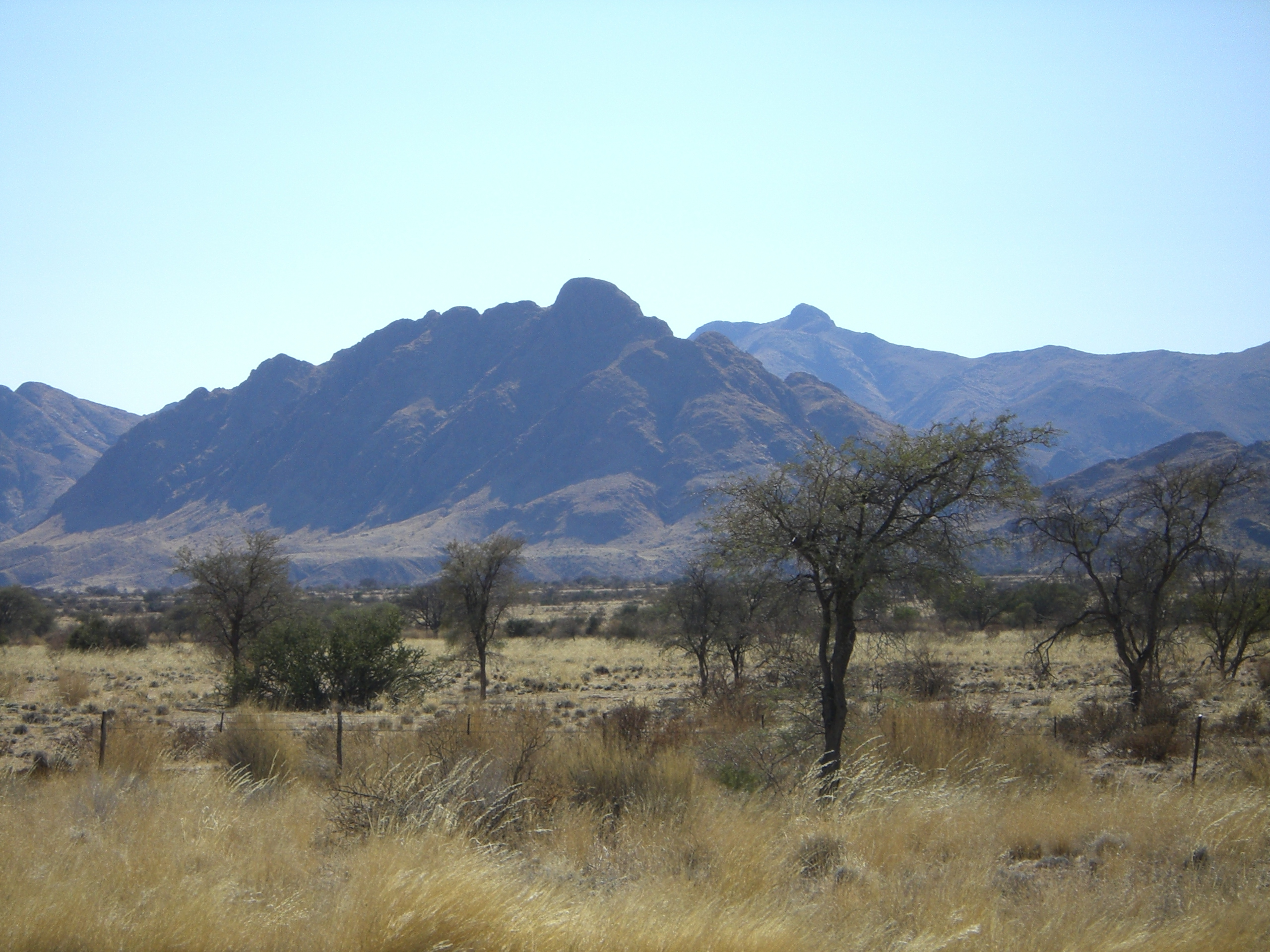
The Great Karas Mountains viewed from the B1 national road

The Great Karas Mountains (Afrikaans: Groot Karasberge) are located in the ǁKaras Region of southern Namibia, the driest part of the country. Mt. Schroffenstein, at 2206 meters is the highest peak in the range. The peak lies about ten kilometers east of the national road B1 between Keetmanshoop and Grünau.

ǁKhauxaǃnas, an uninhabited village with a ruined fortress dating to the 18th century, is located to the east of the mountains.
