= Vioolsdrif =

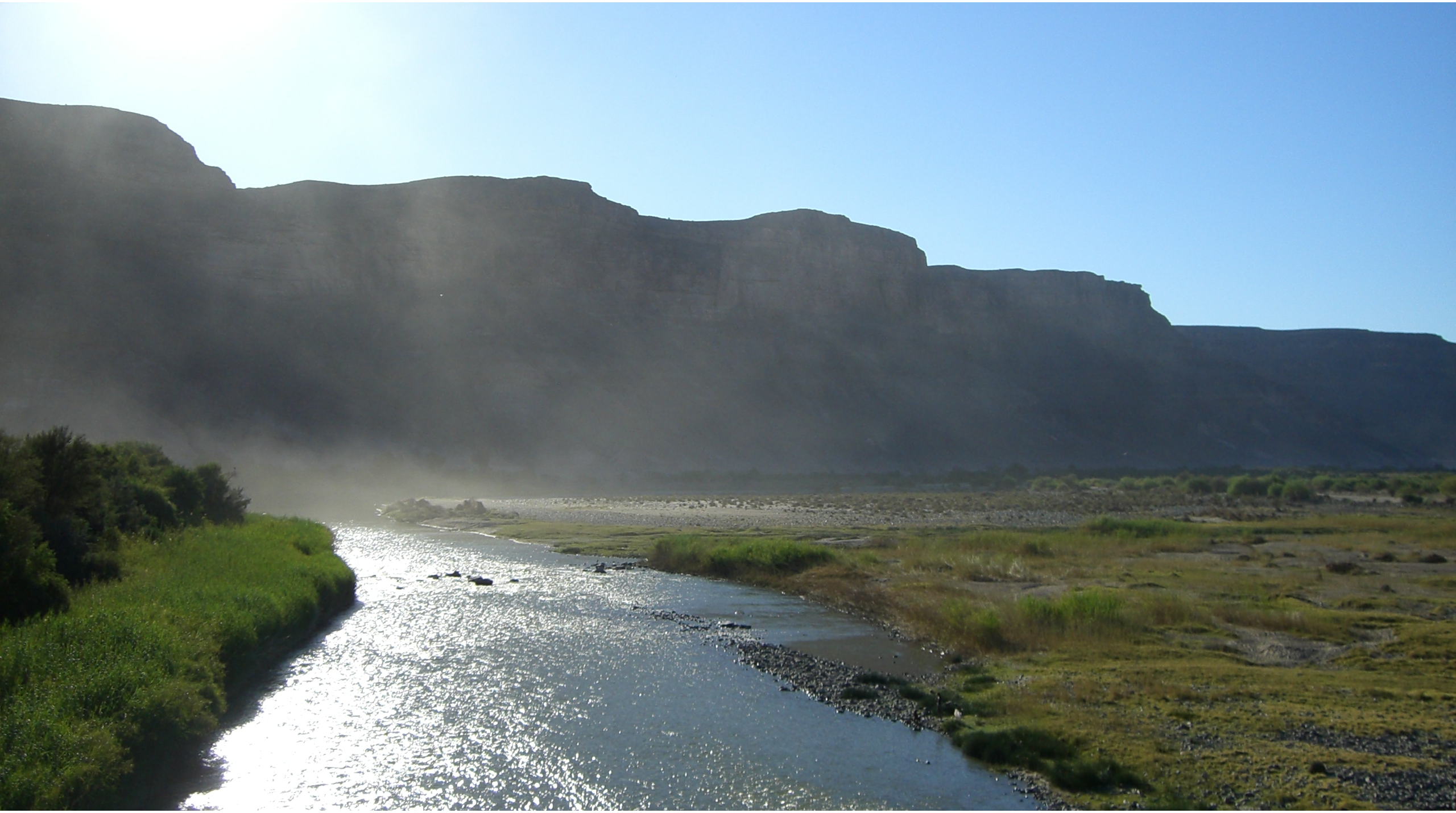
- The Orange River from the border bridge between Noordoewer and Vioolsdrif. Extreme heat and sunlight cause visible evaporation.

- Location within Northern Cape Location within South Africa Location within Africa
- Coordinates: 28°46′30″S 17°37′30″E
- Country: South Africa
- Province: Northern Cape
- District: Namakwa
- Municipality: Nama Khoi

Area
  - Total: 1.98 km^{2} (0.76 sq mi)
- Elevation: 180 m (590 ft)

Population (2011)
  - Total: 599
  - Density: 303/km^{2} (784/sq mi)

Racial makeup (2011)
  - Black African: 18.3%
  - Coloured: 75.0%
  - Indian/Asian: 0.7%
  - White: 4.2%
  - Other: 1.8%

First languages (2011)
  - Afrikaans: 88.4%
  - Tswana: 4.0%
  - Xhosa: 2.2%
  - Sotho: 1.7%
  - Other: 3.6%
- Time zone: UTC+2 (SAST)
- Postal code (street): 8246
- PO box: 8246
- Area code: 027

Vioolsdrif is a village on the Orange River in the north-western Namaqualand area of South Africa.

== Origin of name ==
The name in Afrikaans means 'the ford (shallow river crossing) of the violin'. It is reportedly named after Jan Viool ("John Violin"), who is said to have played the fiddle in these parts in the nineteenth century. Some say he was a Nama man, who used to guide ox-wagons across the ford. An accomplished player, he would fiddle away merrily on the river bank while waiting for wagons to arrive. These claims await elaboration.

== Geography ==
A road bridge here on the N7 national road links South Africa with Namibia and the town harbours the South African border post. At the other end of the bridge is the small Namibian village of Noordoewer (meaning "north bank" in Afrikaans). The area is profoundly arid and the crossing is overlooked by steep and spectacular sandstone cliffs hundreds of metres in height.

In general, the surrounding region is almost unpopulated. There are small pockets of fertile alluvial soil along the course of the river and these are used for growing crops, such as dates and melons, under irrigation.

== Tourism ==
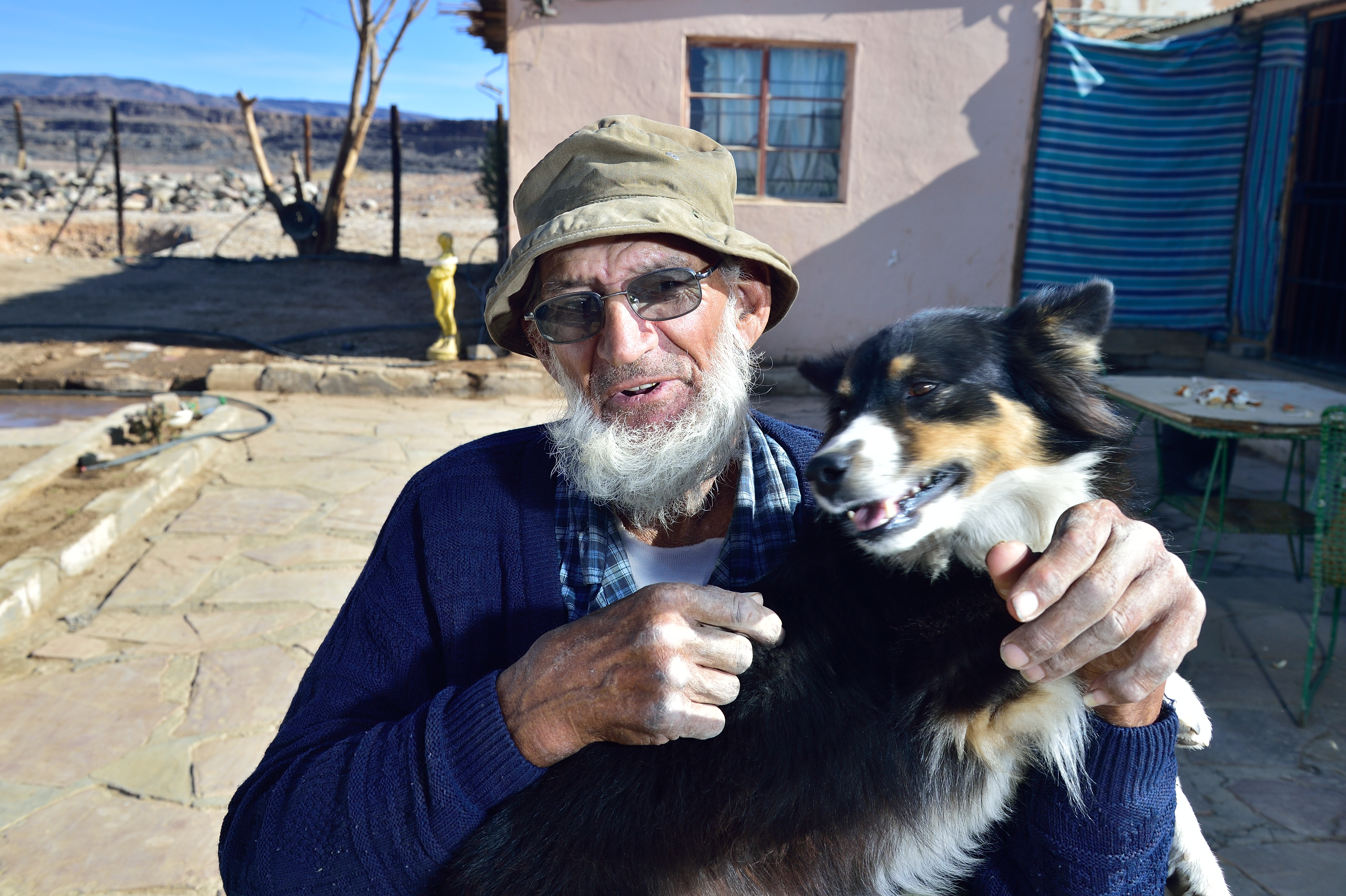
A resident of Vioolsdrift and his dog.

Vioolsdrif has several campsites and motels for motorists passing through the border. Many tour operators have set up their base camps here for rafting tours on the Orange River.

== Climate ==
There are two seasons. The short winter season lasts from about May to July. Almost no rain falls and the weather is hot. The summer season lasts from August to April. It is very hot and rain is highly unlikely. Vioolsdrif is officially one of the hottest places in South Africa; in January 1994 a maximum temperature of 48.8 °C (119.8 °F) was recorded. The mean annual temperature is 24 °C (76 °F) and temperatures above 30 °C (86 °F) are measured on an average of 220 days (60%) of the year. Daytime maximum temperatures above 43 °C (110 °F) and nighttime minimums of 27 °C (80 °F) are a regular weather phenomenon in summer.

Climate data for Vioolsdrif, elevation 168 m (551 ft), (1991–2020 normals, extremes 1998–2023)
Month	Jan	Feb	Mar	Apr	May	Jun	Jul	Aug	Sep	Oct	Nov	Dec	Year
Record high °C (°F)	48.4 (119.1)	48.1 (118.6)	47.3 (117.1)	44.8 (112.6)	39.0 (102.2)	34.4 (93.9)	33.5 (92.3)	39.5 (103.1)	41.3 (106.3)	46.9 (116.4)	46.5 (115.7)	46.7 (116.1)	48.4 (119.1)
Mean daily maximum °C (°F)	40.4 (104.7)	40.5 (104.9)	38.7 (101.7)	35.0 (95.0)	30.4 (86.7)	26.6 (79.9)	26.5 (79.7)	28.1 (82.6)	31.4 (88.5)	35.3 (95.5)	37.0 (98.6)	38.7 (101.7)	34.1 (93.3)
Daily mean °C (°F)	31.3 (88.3)	31.7 (89.1)	30.4 (86.7)	27.0 (80.6)	22.5 (72.5)	18.8 (65.8)	18.5 (65.3)	19.7 (67.5)	22.9 (73.2)	26.4 (79.5)	28.2 (82.8)	29.8 (85.6)	25.6 (78.1)
Mean daily minimum °C (°F)	22.3 (72.1)	22.9 (73.2)	22.0 (71.6)	19.0 (66.2)	14.6 (58.3)	11.1 (52.0)	10.6 (51.1)	11.4 (52.5)	14.3 (57.7)	17.2 (63.0)	19.0 (66.2)	20.7 (69.3)	17.1 (62.8)
Record low °C (°F)	12.9 (55.2)	13.5 (56.3)	13.3 (55.9)	8.5 (47.3)	6.0 (42.8)	4.4 (39.9)	2.2 (36.0)	0.0 (32.0)	4.9 (40.8)	8.2 (46.8)	10.6 (51.1)	13.6 (56.5)	0.0 (32.0)
Average precipitation mm (inches)	4.0 (0.16)	5.6 (0.22)	8.6 (0.34)	8.4 (0.33)	4.7 (0.19)	2.9 (0.11)	4.5 (0.18)	2.3 (0.09)	2.0 (0.08)	2.6 (0.10)	1.9 (0.07)	5.1 (0.20)	52.6 (2.07)
Average precipitation days (≥ 0.25 mm)	0.4	0.6	1.3	1.3	0.9	0.9	0.9	0.7	0.6	0.6	0.4	0.4	9
Source: Starlings Roost Weather (precipitation 1952–2023)
