= Karasburg East =

Electoral constituency in the ǁKharas region of southern Namibia

Karasburg East constituency (red) in the ǁKaras Region

Karasburg East is an electoral constituency in the ǁKharas Region of Namibia. As of 2020 the constituency had 6,553 registered voters.

Karasburg East was created in August 2013 from the eastern part of Karasburg Constituency, following a recommendation of the Fourth Delimitation Commission of Namibia, and in preparation of the 2014 general election. The administrative centre of Karasburg East is the town of Karasburg.

== Politics ==
In the 2015 regional elections, Dennis Benjamin Coetzee of SWAPO won the constituency with 1,602 votes. His only opponent, Albertus Laurentius Jossop of the Democratic Turnhalle Alliance (DTA) obtained 504 votes. The 2020 regional election was won by Angeline Vincentina Beukes of the Landless People's Movement (LPM, a new party registered in 2018). She obtained 1,280 votes. The sitting SWAPO councillor Coetzee came second with 692 votes, followed by William Henry Cloete of the Independent Patriots for Change (IPC, an opposition party formed in August 2020) with 675 votes.

== See also ==
- Administrative divisions of Namibia
