= Grünau, Namibia =

Grünau
- Settlement
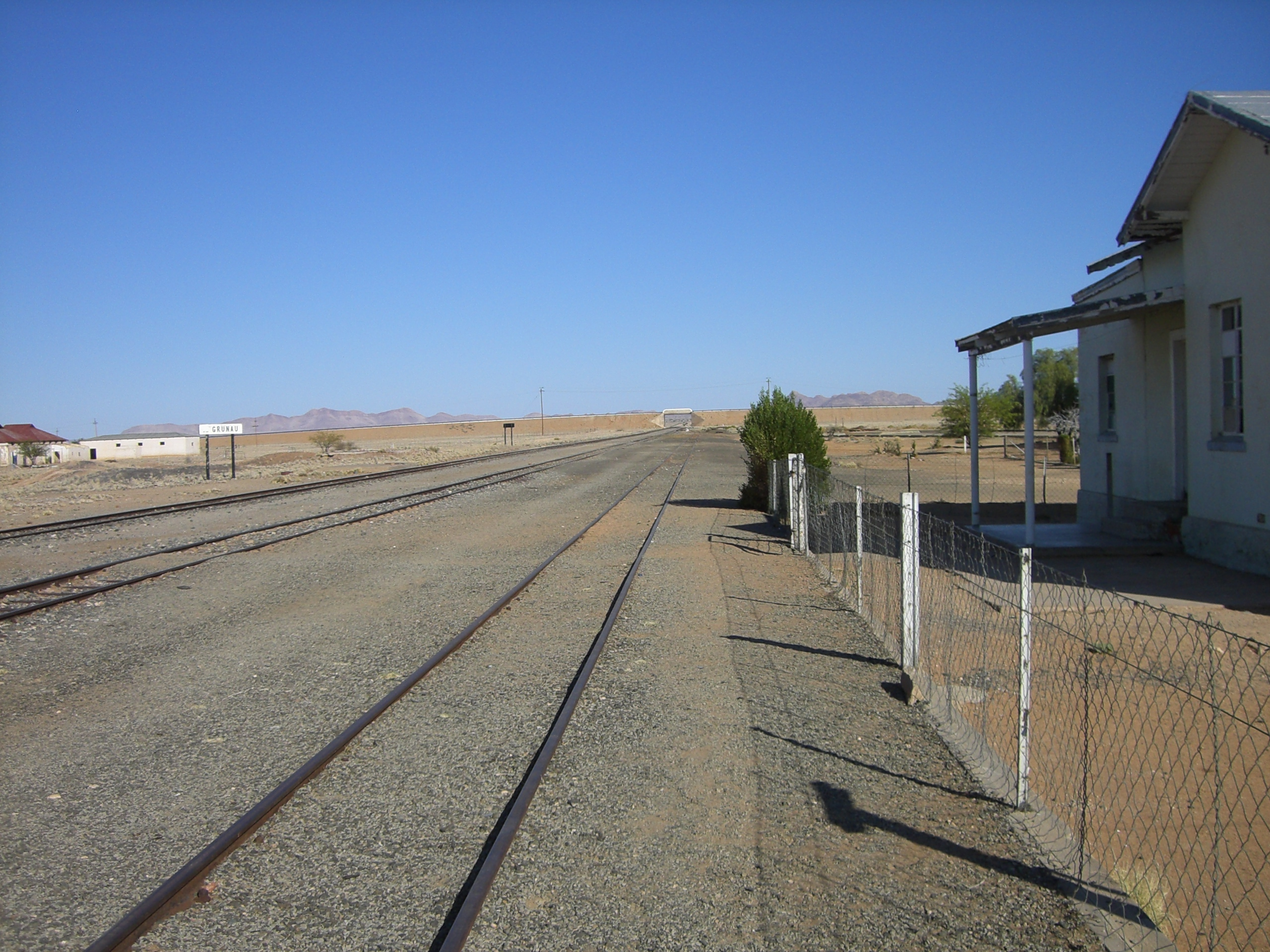
- Grünau Railway Station with the decommissioned station building on the right

- Location in Namibia
- Coordinates: 27°44′S 18°23′E
- Country: Namibia
- Region: ǁKaras Region
- Constituency: Karasburg Constituency
- Established: 1902
- Elevation: 1,098 m (3,602 ft)
- Time zone: UTC+2 (South African Standard Time)

Grünau is a settlement in the ǁKaras Region of southern Namibia, west of Karasburg. It is linked to the South African border posts near Noordoewer via the B1 and near Nakop via the B3. Grünau belongs to the Karasburg electoral constituency.

Upon independence of Namibia Grünau was a village, governed by a seven-seat village council. The 1992 Namibian local elections was narrowly won by SWAPO which gained 95 votes and four seats, followed by the opposition Democratic Turnhalle Alliance (DTA) which gained 92 votes and three seats. The village status of Grünau was revoked before the 1998 local authority elections, so that it came under the governance of the ǁKharas Regional Council.

A small desalination plant was built in 2020 to counter the poor quality of groundwater in the settlement.
