= Noordoewer =

- Settlement
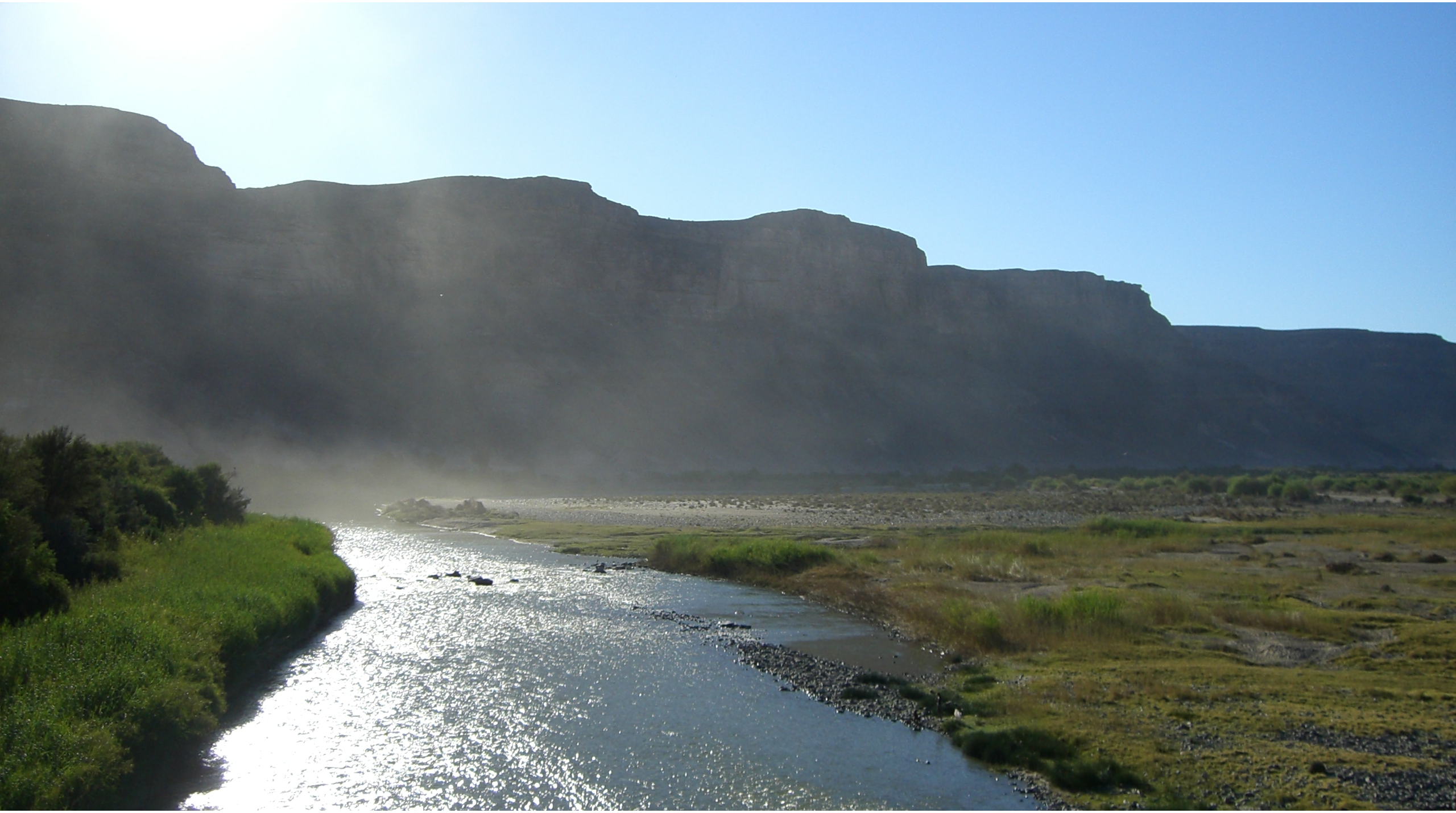
- The Orange River on the border bridge between Noordoewer and Vioolsdrif. Extreme heat and sunlight cause visible evaporation.

- Location in Namibia
- Coordinates: 28°43′S 17°37′E
- Country: Namibia
- Region: ǁKaras Region
- Constituency: Karasburg West
- Time zone: UTC+2 (South African Standard Time)

Noordoewer is a settlement in the ǁKaras Region of southern Namibia. Its name means 'North Bank' in Afrikaans, in reference to the north bank of the Orange River, on which it is located. The village lies opposite the South African town of Vioolsdrif, to which it is connected by the road bridge which forms the northern end of the South African N7 and the southern end of the Namibian B1.

Noordoewer is known for grape production and canoeing and is an important border post on a crucial transport route between the two countries. It is planned to upgrade its status to that of a town.

Upon Independence of Namibia Noordoewer was a village, governed by a seven-seat village council. In the 1992 Namibian local elections only 200 people cast their votes. It was comfortably won by SWAPO which gained 154 votes and six seats. The opposition Democratic Turnhalle Alliance (DTA) gathered 30 votes and the remaining seat. The village status of Noordoewer was revoked before the 1998 local authority elections, so that it came under the governance of the ǁKaras Regional Council.
