= Karasburg =

Town in Karas Region, Namibia

Karasburg ǀNomsoros Kalkfontein
- Town
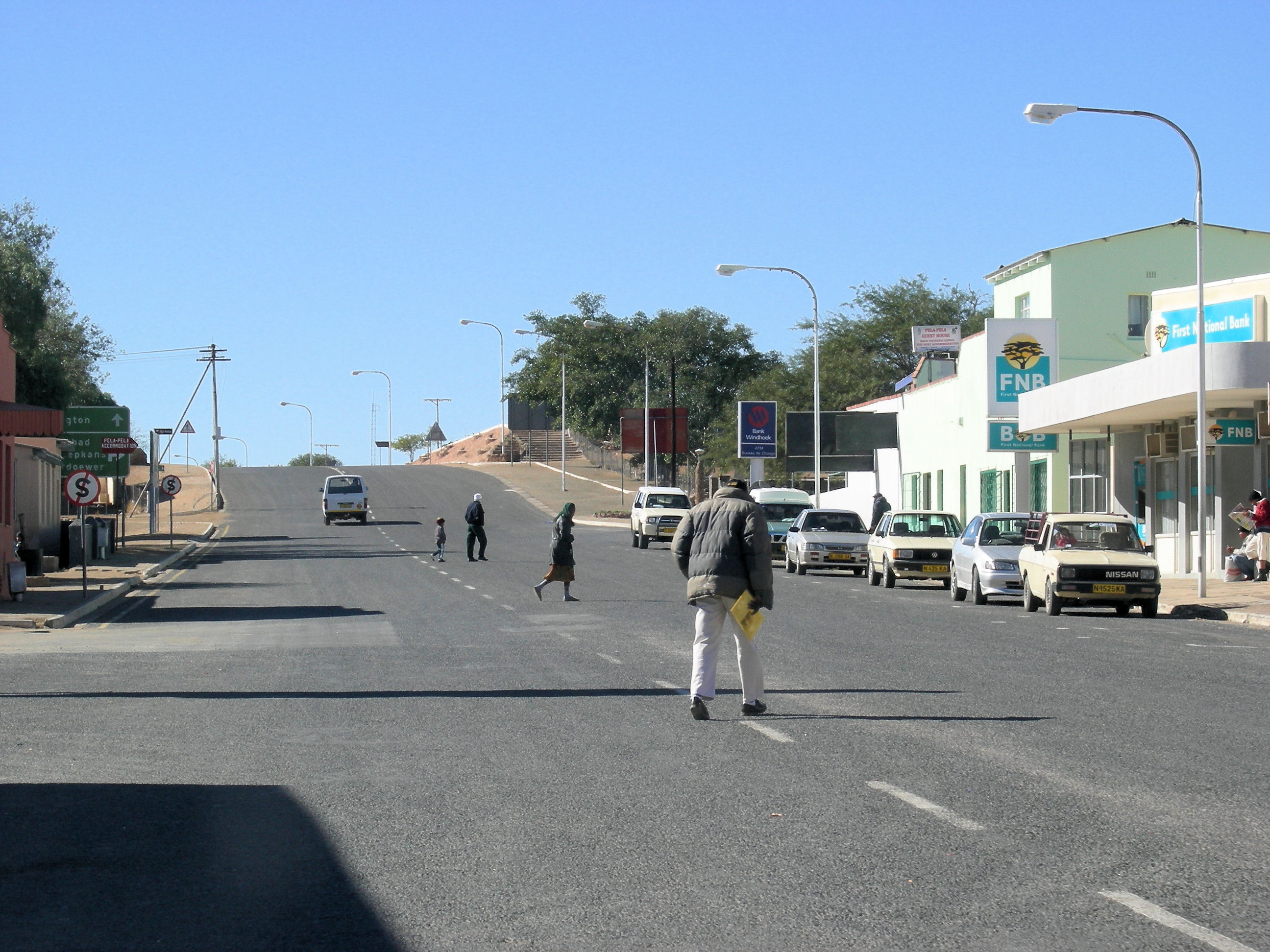

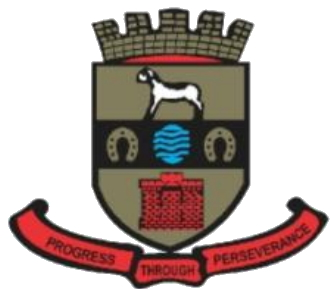
- Coat of arms
- Interactive map of Karasburg
- Location in Namibia
- Coordinates: 28°1′S 18°45′E
- Country: Namibia
- Region: ǁKaras Region
- Constituency: Karasburg East

Government
  - Mayor: Ernest Willem Anderson

Population (2023)
  - Total: 6,621
- Time zone: UTC+2 (SAST)
- Climate: BWh

Karasburg (Khoekhoe: ǀNomsoros, old name Afrikaans: Kalkfontein, literally "carst spring") is a town in the ǁKaras Region of southern Namibia and the district capital of the Karasburg East electoral constituency. It lies at the heart of the southern Namibian sheep farming industry. Karasburg had a population of 6,621 people in 2023.

== Geography ==
The town lies 710 km (440 mi) south of Windhoek, 862-kilometre (536 mi) north of Cape Town and 110 km (68 mi) west of the Ariamsvlei border post. Karasburg is the only town south of Keetmanshoop in Namibia.

There are three main routes that lead into Karasburg. The B3 national road connects Karasburg to Grünau in the north-west and Ariamsvlei and the South African border in the east. The regional road C10 leads to ǀAi-ǀAis in the west and Onseepkans and the South African border in the south-east, and the C11 regional road connects north-east to Aroab and Koës.

Historical population
Year	Pop.	±% p.a.
2001	4,075	—
2011	4,401	+0.77%
2023	6,621	+3.46%

=== Climate ===
Karasburg has an extreme climate most of the year with temperatures rising well over 40 degrees Celsius in summer and dropping to sub-zero in winter. Low rainfall is experienced in this region (annual average rainfall: 128 millimetres (5.0 in) at the Karasburg weather station), the rainy season usually arriving in early January and leaving as late as early April.

== Economy ==
Karasburg's main industry is sheep farming, but it is also an important truck stop for transport vehicles streaming into Namibia from the South African border. The town supports several massive farms in the area. The town also has its own airstrip which is used mainly for light aircraft or as an emergency landing strip for larger planes. Karasburg Railway Station was once the busiest train station in Southern Namibia and is also the last significant stop before Upington. Bondels Dam, built in 1959, lies 7-kilometre (4.3 mi) west of the town.

Karasburg was downgraded from municipality to town status in 2010. The town is riddled with unemployment as there is no industry, and the little rainfall hampers commercial farming.

== Politics ==
Karasburg is governed by a town council that has seven seats.

The first local election run after Namibian independence, the 1992 local elections, was won by SWAPO which obtained 757 votes and gained three seats. The Democratic Turnhalle Alliance (DTA) came second with 629 votes and also three seats. The remaining seat went to the United Democratic Front (UDF, 169 votes). The 1998 local authority elections was narrowly won by the DTA. It obtained four seats with 284 votes. SWAPO came second with three seats and 258 votes.

In the 2010 local authority election in Karasburg, a total of 808 votes were recorded. SWAPO won with approximately 46% of the vote. Of the three other parties seeking votes in the election, Rally for Democracy and Progress (Namibia) (RDP) received approximately 33% of the vote, followed by the Democratic Party of Namibia (DPN, 14%) and the DTA with 6%. The resulting local council including three SWAPO members, three RDP members and one DPN member. The DPN's Caroline Arendse was elected mayor as the result of an alliance with SWAPO on 3 December 2010. However, the national Democratic Party condemned the alliance and called the swearing-in ceremony fraudulent. On 8 December, Arendse was recalled from her position in the council and replaced with Ernest Willem Anderson.

The 2015 local authority election was also won by SWAPO which gained five seats (586 votes). The remaining two seats went to the DTA with 204 votes. In the 2020 local authority election the Landless People's Movement (LPM, a new party registered in 2018) won with 572 votes and gained four seats. SWAPO was the runner-up with 294 votes and two seats. The remaining council seat went to the Independent Patriots for Change (IPC, an opposition party formed in August 2020) with 241 votes.

== People from Karasburg ==
- John Walters (born 1956), Namibian ombudsman 2004–2021
- Ida Hoffmann (born 1947), politician
