= Karasburg West =

Electoral constituency in Namibia

Karasburg West constituency (red) in the ǁKaras Region

Karasburg West is an electoral constituency in the ǁKharas Region of Namibia. As of 2020 the constituency had 6,609 registered voters.

Karasburg West was created in August 2013 from the western part of Karasburg Constituency, following a recommendation of the Fourth Delimitation Commission of Namibia, and in preparation of the 2014 general election. The administrative centre of Karasburg West is the village of Noordoewer.

== Politics ==
In the 2015 regional elections, Paulus Amukoshi Ephraim of SWAPO won the constituency with 566 votes, defeating Charles Leon Peter of the Democratic Turnhalle Alliance (DTA, 222 votes) and Elifas Tulonga Shipani of the Rally for Democracy and Progress (RDP, 97 votes). The 2020 regional election was also won by the SWAPO candidate. Taimi Namwenyo Kanyemba obtained 871 votes, ahead of Ephraim Tchetu Itha of the Independent Patriots for Change (IPC, an opposition party formed in August 2020) with 485 votes, Ivan Josob of the Landless People's Movement (LPM, a new party registered in 2018) with 293 votes and independent candidate Arnold Luther Witbooi with 189 votes.

== See also ==
- Administrative divisions of Namibia
