= ǁKharas Region =

ǁKharas Region ǁKaras Region
- Region
- Location of the ǁKharas Region in Namibia
- Country: Namibia
- Capital: Keetmanshoop

Government
  - Governor: Dawid Gertze

Area
  - Total: 161,514 km^{2} (62,361 sq mi)

Population (2023 census)
  - Total: 109,893
  - Density: 0.680393/km^{2} (1.76221/sq mi)
- Time zone: UTC+2 (CAT)
- HDI (2017): 0.687 medium · 3rd
- Website: karasrc.gov.na

The ǁKharas Region (Khoekhoe pronunciation: [ᵏǁʰa.ɾas], with a lateral click; formerly Karas Region, without the click) is the southernmost, largest, and least densely populated of the 14 regions of Namibia; its capital is Keetmanshoop. The name assigned to the region reflects the prominence of the Karas mountain range in its southern part. The ǁKharas region contains the municipality of Keetmanshoop, the towns Karasburg, Lüderitz and Oranjemund, and the self-governed villages Aroab, Berseba, Bethanie, Koës and Tses.

ǁKharas' western border is the shores of the Atlantic Ocean. Its location in Namibia's south means that it shares a long border in the south and east with the Northern Cape Province of South Africa. Domestically, it borders only the Hardap Region, to the north.

== Politics ==
ǁKaras constituencies (2014)

As of 2020, ǁKharas had 56,352 registered voters. The name of this region was Karas Region (without the alveolar lateral click of the Khoekhoegowab language) since Namibian independence in 1990. In an effort to consolidate spelling, it was renamed to ǁKharas Region in October 2015.

=== Constituencies ===
The region is subdivided into seven electoral constituencies:

- Berseba
- Karasburg East (created 2013 from a split of Karasburg Constituency)
- Karasburg West (created 2013 from a split of Karasburg Constituency)
- Keetmanshoop Rural
- Keetmanshoop Urban
- ǃNamiǂNûs (formerly Lüderitz Constituency)
- Oranjemund

=== Presidential elections ===
As in all other regions, SWAPO was by far the strongest political party since Namibian independence. In the 2004 presidential election, the region supported SWAPO's Hifikepunye Pohamba with 65% of the votes. No other candidate received more than 10%.

=== Regional elections ===
In the 2004 regional election for the National Assembly of Namibia, SWAPO won all six constituencies.

In the 2015 regional elections, SWAPO obtained 83% of the total votes (2010: 64%) and won all seven constituencies. In the 2020 regional election the Landless People's Movement (LPM, an opposition party formed in 2016) narrowly became the strongest party. It obtained 39% of votes overall and won four of the seven constituencies, SWAPO got 36% and won the remaining three.

=== Governors ===
- Dawid Boois (2004-)
- Bernadus Swartbooi (until 2015)
- Lucia Basson (2015–2020)
- Aletta Fredericks (2020–2025)
- Dawid Gertze (July 2025–)

== Economy and infrastructure ==
Aerial video of Fish River Canyon, Kolmanskop Ghost Town, and the town of Lüderitz, all located in the ǁKaras Region of Namibia.

The region is predominantly a small stock-farming area, the stock mostly consisting of animals such as sheep or goats. Game farming and irrigation farming along the Naute Dam and the Orange River have gained significantly in importance.

Notable places in the region include the harbour town of Lüderitz and its fishing and boat-building industry, the diamond areas along the coast—both on- and off shore—with Oranjemund as the main centre, mining enterprises in the southern part of Namibia such as the Haib mine (Klein Karas area, Rosh Pinah), the Kudu Gas field in the Atlantic Ocean near Lüderitz, and small-scale industries in Lüderitz and Keetmanshoop.

The Hot Water Springs at Ai-Ais, the Hot Water Springs in Warmbad, the Kokerboom Forest (Quiver Tree Forest) near Keetmanshoop, the Fish River Canyon (the second-largest in the world), the Brukkaros Mountain (a former volcano) near Berseba, the coastal town Lüderitz, and several guest and game farms have become important tourist attractions. The tourism industry has the potential for further expansion.

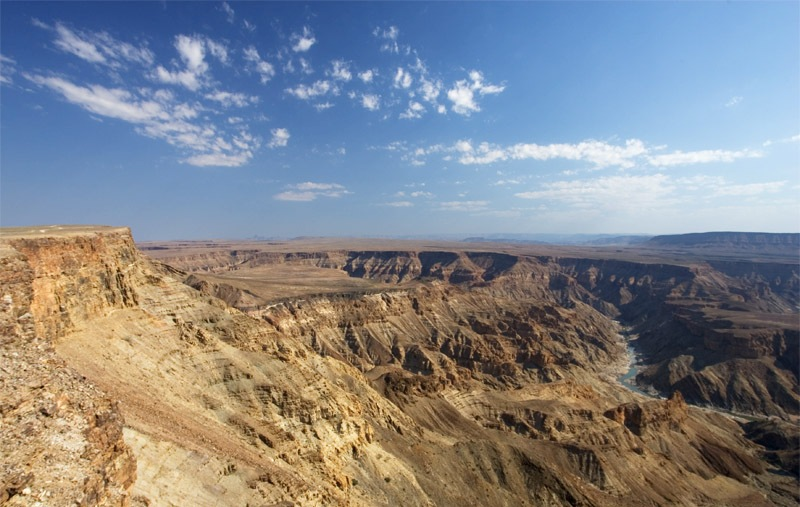
Fish River Canyon - Namibia

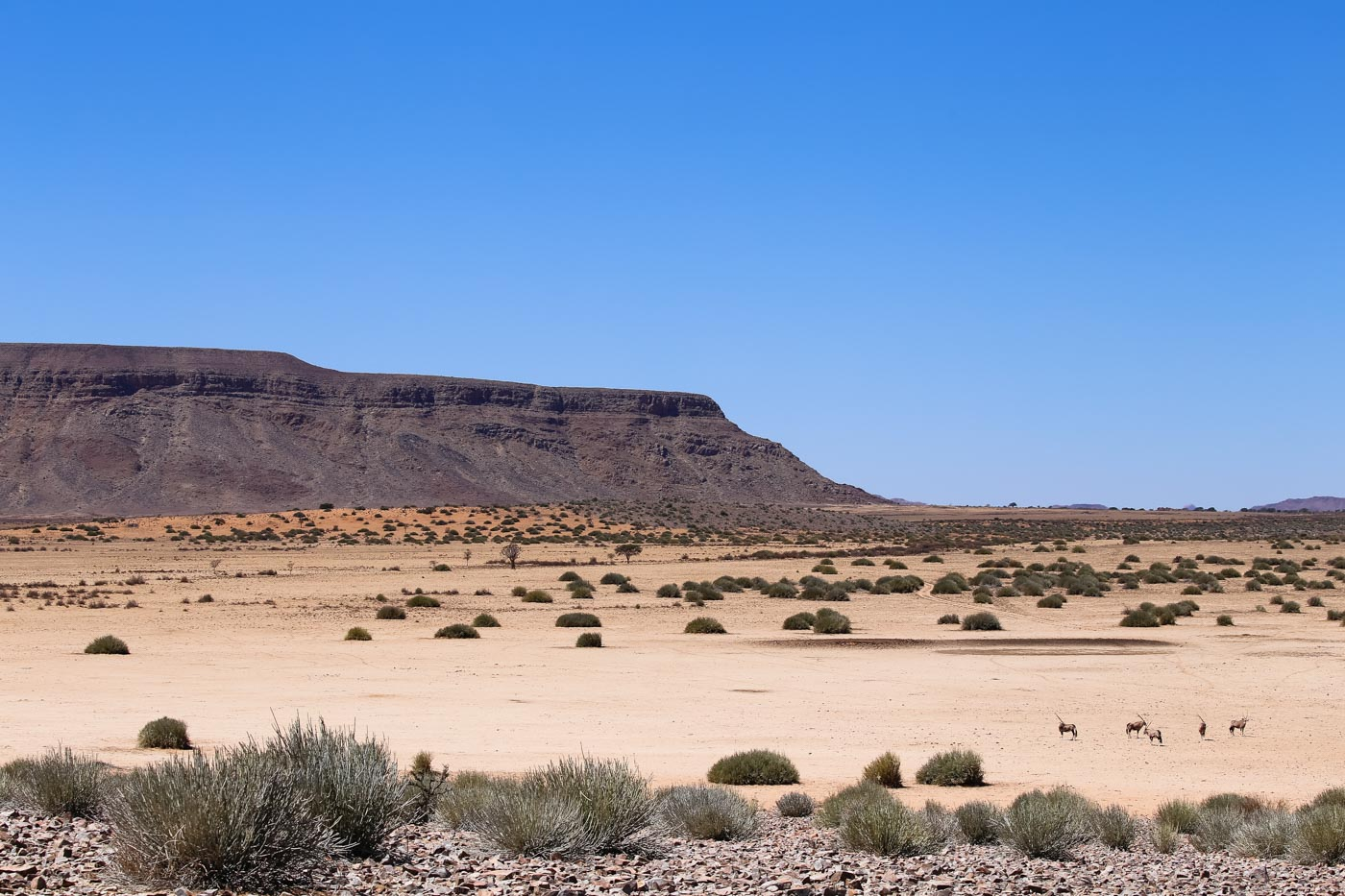
Gemsbok - Fish River Canyon

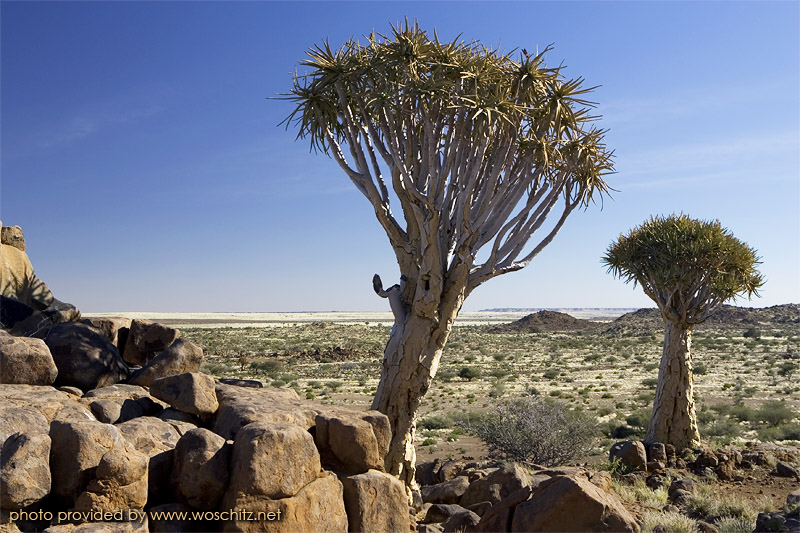
Quivertree Forest - Namibia

The economic growth potential of the area is considerable, but needs an intensive general development policy. It is a profitable tax-generating area, which predominantly comes from diamond mining for the central government.

The main railway line and two main trunk roads give access to South Africa. Keetmanshoop is considered as the capital of the south and has direct air, railway, and road links with Windhoek. Its airport is of international standards and suitable for international air traffic. There is an airfield at Kolmanskop near Lüderitz. Well-developed landing facilities also exist at Oranjemund.

ǁKharas has 49 schools with a total of 20,110 pupils.

== Demographics ==
According to the Namibia 2001 Population and Housing Census, ǁKharas had a population of 69,329 (32,346 females and 36,976 males or 114 males for every 100 females) growing at an annual rate of 1.3%. The fertility rate was 3.1 children per woman. About 54% lived in urban areas, while 46% lived in rural areas, and with an area of 161,215 km^{2}, the population density was 0.4 persons per km^{2}. Classified by age, 11% of the population was under 5 years old, 20% between 5 and 14 years, 63% between 15 and 59 years, and 6% 60 years and older. The population was divided into 15,481 households, with an average size of 4.1 persons; 35% of households had a female head of house, while 65% had a male as head. For those 15 years and older, 69% had never married, 20% married with certificate, 2% married traditionally, 5% married consensually, 1% were divorced or separated, and 2% were widowed.

The most commonly spoken languages at home were Afrikaans (40% of households), Nama/Damara (26%) and Oshiwambo (23%). For those 15 years and older, the literacy rate was 87%. Nearly 45% of the population are from coloured and white Namibian groups. In terms of education, 52% of girls and 48% of boys between the ages of 6 and 15 were attending school, and of those 15 years and older, 77% had left school, 7% were currently at school, and 7% had never attended.

In 2001, the employment rate for the labor force (67% of those 15+) was 71% employed and 29% unemployed. For those 15 years old or older and not in the labor force (24%), 28% were students, 40% homemakers, and 32% retired or unable to work. According to the 2012 Namibia Labour Force Survey, unemployment in the ǁKaras Region stood at 23.9%. The two studies are methodologically not comparable.

Among households, 94% had safe water, 26% no toilet facility, 50% electricity for lighting, 81% access to radio, and 35% had wood or charcoal for cooking. In terms of households' main sources of income, 7% derived it from farming, 69% from wages and salaries, 6% cash remittances, 5% from business or nonfarming, and 10% from pension.

For every 1,000 live births, 37 female and 56 male infant deaths occurred. The life expectancy at birth was 61 years for females and 54 for males. Among children younger than 15, 4% had lost a mother, 6% a father, and 1% were orphaned by both parents. About 3% of the entire population had a disability, of which 22% were deaf, 29% blind, 10% had a speech disability, 13% a hand disability, 27% a leg disability, and 7% a mental disability.
