= List of islands of Namibia =

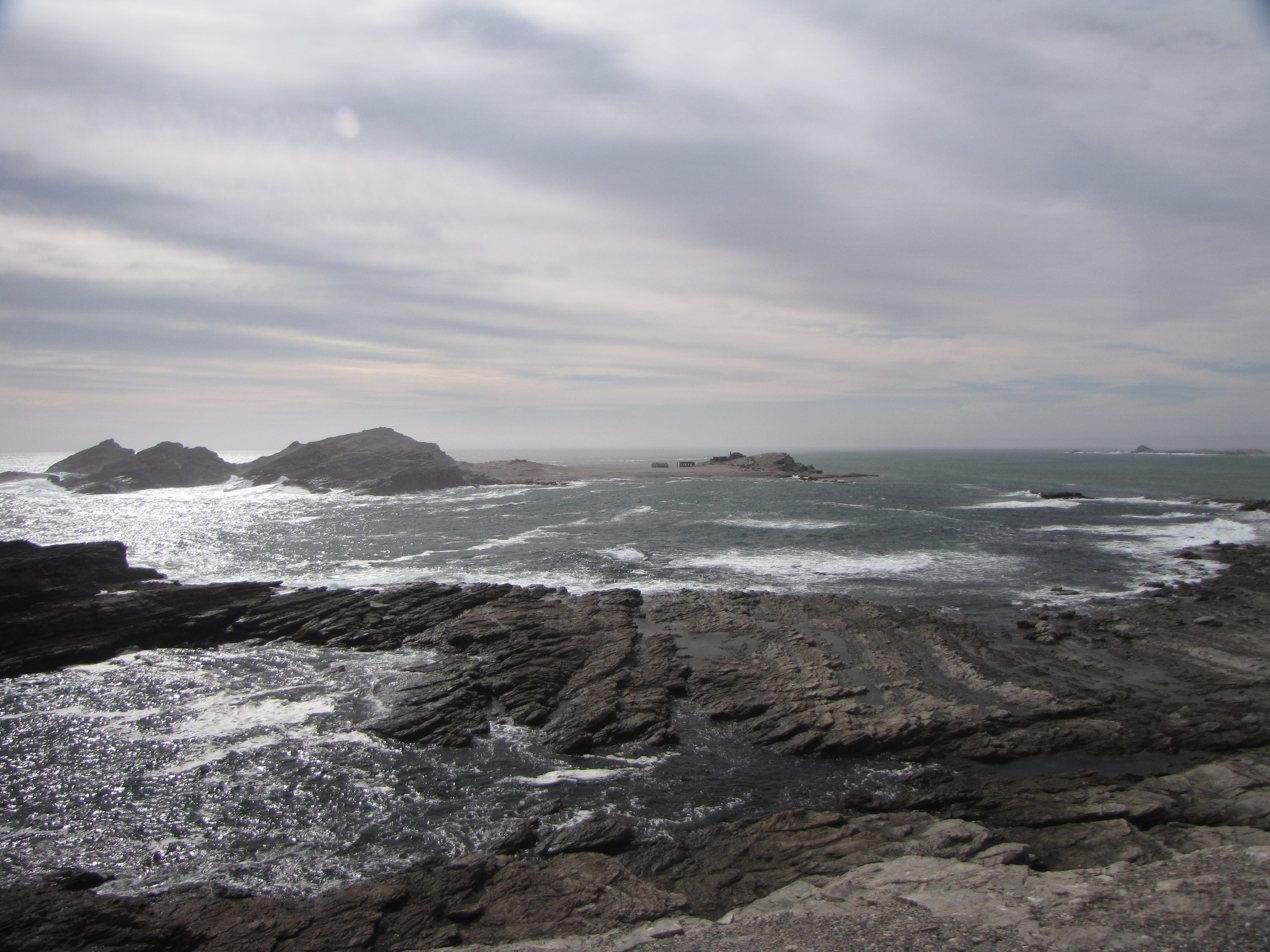
Halifax Island

Namibia has many islands. Here are some of them:

- Bird Island
- Impalila

== Penguin Islands ==
The Penguin Islands consist of:

From north to south:
Name	coordinates
Hollam's Bird Island	24°38′S 14°31′E
Mercury Island	25.719161°S 14.832948°E
Ichaboe Island	25°43′S 14°50′E
Black Rock	26°05′S 14°58′E
Staple Rock	26°22′S 14°58′E
Marshall Reef	26°22′S 14°58′E
Boat Bay Rocks	26°25′S 15°5′E
Seal Island	26°36′S 15°9′E
Penguin Island	26°37′S 15°9′E
Halifax Island	26°39′S 15°5′E
Graget Island	26°00′S 15°11′E
Albatross Rock	27°07′S 15°13′E
Possession Island	27°01′S 15°13′E
Pomona Island	27°12′S 15°15′E
North Long Island	26°49′S 15°8′E
South Long Island	26°50′S 15°8′E
Black Rock	24°56′S 14°48′E
Black Sophie Rock	27°38′S 15°31′E
Plumpudding Island	27°38′S 15°32′E
Sinclair Island (Roast Beef Island)	27°40′S 15°32′E
Little Roastbeef Islets	27°42′S 15°32′E
