= List of shipwrecks in March 1845 =

The list of shipwrecks in March 1845 includes ships sunk, foundered, wrecked, grounded, or otherwise lost during March 1845.

== 1 March ==
List of shipwrecks: 1 March 1845
Ship	State	Description
Isabella	United Kingdom	The brig was driven ashore in Robin Hoods Bay. She had become a wreck by 12 March.

== 2 March ==
List of shipwrecks: 2 March 1845
Ship	State	Description
Echo	Denmark	The schooner was driven ashore on Neuwerk.

== 3 March ==
List of shipwrecks: 3 March 1845
Ship	State	Description
Adolphe	Hamburg	The ship was driven ashore on Scharhörn. She was on a voyage from Valparaíso, Chile to Hamburg. She was refloated on 20 March and taken in to Cuxhaven.
Dove	United Kingdom	The ship ran aground on the Sand Heads, off the Isle of Wight. She was on a voyage from Youghal, County Cork to London. She was refloated the next day and taken in to Cowes.
Eleanor	United Kingdom	The ship ran aground and sank off Egremont, Cumberland.
Ignacio	Spain	The ship was wrecked near Dover, Kent, United Kingdom. Her crew were rescued. She was on a voyage from London, United Kingdom to Santander and Bilbao.
Rose	United Kingdom	The ship was driven ashore and wrecked at Filey Bridge, Yorkshire. She was on a voyage from Grimsby, Lincolnshire to Filey. She was refloated the next day and beached at Filey.
Search	United Kingdom	The ship sprang a leak in the North Sea. She was run ashore at the mouth of the River Tees and was wrecked. She was on a voyage from Great Yarmouth, Norfolk to South Shields, County Durham.

== 4 March ==
List of shipwrecks: 4 March 1845
Ship	State	Description
Due Sorelle	France	The ship collided with Carlotta ( Kingdom of the Two Sicilies) and sank off Cartagena, Spain. Her crew were rescued. Due Sorelle was on a voyage from Alicante, Spain to Gibraltar.

== 5 March ==
List of shipwrecks: 5 March 1845
Ship	State	Description
George	United Kingdom	The ship collided with Mellona ( (United Kingdom of Great Britain and Ireland) ) Guernsey off the Newarp Lightship ( Trinity House) and was run aground on the Barber Sand with the loss of three of her crew. She was on a voyage from South Shields, County Durham to Cowes, Isle of Wight.

== 6 March ==
List of shipwrecks: 6 March 1845
Ship	State	Description
George and Elizabeth	United Kingdom	The ship ran aground on the Barnard Sand, in the North Sea, off the coast of Norfolk. She was refloated and taken in to Harwich, Essex in a leaky condition.
Elizabeth and Samuel	United Kingdom	The ship was driven ashore at Caister-on-Sea, Norfolk.

== 7 March ==
List of shipwrecks: 8 March 1845
Ship	State	Description
Mary Wilson	United Kingdom	The ship foundered in the North Sea off the mouth of the River Tees with the loss of all hands.

== 8 March ==
List of shipwrecks: 8 March 1845
Ship	State	Description
Ann Guthrie	United Kingdom	The ship was in collision with the Royal Victoria (United Kingdom) and sank in the River Thames at Limehouse Reach. Her crew were rescued. She was on a voyage from Sligo to London.
Colonial	France	The ship was driven ashore at "Fort-George", Mauritius. She was refloated on 19 March and taken in to port.
Jenny Jones	United Kingdom	The ship was wrecked 3 nautical miles (5.6 km) east of Rio Bueno, Jamaica.
Jucht Rachel	Denmark	The ship was abandoned in the Kattegat. Her crew were rescued. She was on a voyage from Newcastle upon Tyne, Northumberland, United Kingdom to Copenhagen. She was subsequently taken in to Langeland.
Lady Jane Stewart	United Kingdom	The ship ran aground on the Gunfleet Sand, in the North Sea off the coast of Essex. She floated off but consequently foundered 3 to 4 nautical miles (5.6 to 7.4 km) off the Sunk Lightship ( Trinity House). Her crew were rescued by the schooner Adventure (United Kingdom). The ship was on a voyage from Perth to London.
Reaper	United Kingdom	The yawl was run down and sunk by a collier off Flamborough Head, Yorkshire. Her crew were rescued.
Spinx	(Ottoman Empire) Egypt	The steamship ran aground on the River Nile. She was on a voyage from Boulaq to Cairo. She was refloated and put back to Boulaq.

== 9 March ==
List of shipwrecks: 9 March 1845
Ship	State	Description
Alexandre	France	The brig was wrecked near Sines, Portugal with the loss of a crew member. She was on a voyage from Rouen, Seine-Inférieure to Cette, Hérault.

== 10 March ==
List of shipwrecks: 10 March 1845
Ship	State	Description
Amelie	France	The ship was driven ashore and wrecked near A Coruña, Spain. Her crew were rescued. She was on a voyage from Bordeaux, Gironde to Toulon, Var.
Emerald	United States	The barque was wrecked on the coast of Madagascar.
Mary Ann Brown	United Kingdom	The ship was wrecked on the Orteg Bank, off the coast of Argentina. She was on a voyage from Cádiz, Spain to Montevideo, Uruguay and Buenos Aires, Argentina.

== 11 March ==
List of shipwrecks: 11 March 1845
Ship	State	Description
Belle	United Kingdom	The ship was driven ashore and wrecked on Terceira Island, Azores. Her crew were rescued.
Harison	United Kingdom	The schooner ran aground on the Grain Spit, off the coast of Kent. She was refloated and taken in to Sheerness, Kent.
Heir Apparent	United Kingdom	The ship ran aground on the Dutchman's Bank, in the Irish Sea off the coast of Anglesey. She was on a voyage from Newhaven, Sussex to Liverpool, Lancashire. She was refloated and put in to Beaumaris, Anglesey.

== 12 March ==
List of shipwrecks: 12 March 1845
Ship	State	Description
Coquette	United Kingdom	The ship was wrecked on a reef 15 nautical miles (28 km) south east of Cádiz, Spain. Her crew were rescued. She was on a voyage from Gibraltar to Cádiz.
Crusader	United Kingdom	The ship was driven ashore at Orfordness, Suffolk.
Elise	France	The ship was wrecked at Cabrita Point, Spain. She was on a voyage from Cette, Herault to Brest.
St. Aubin	(United Kingdom of Great Britain and Ireland) Jersey	The ship was driven ashore south of Algeciras, Spain. She was on a voyage from Marsala, Sicily to Jersey. She was refloated the next day.
Themis	United Kingdom	The ship foundered in the Atlantic Ocean off the Isles of Scilly. She was on a voyage from Galway to London.

== 13 March ==
List of shipwrecks: 13 March 1845
Ship	State	Description
Clyde	United Kingdom	The ship ran aground and capsized in the River Trent. She was on a voyage from Gainsborough, Lincolnshire to Whitstable, Kent. She was later righted and taken in to Hull, Yorkshire.
Endeavour	United Kingdom	The ship was driven ashore and wrecked at Orfordness, Suffolk. Her crew were rescued. She was on a voyage from London to Great Yarmouth, Norfolk.
Jack	United Kingdom	The ship ran aground on the Five Fathom Middle Sand, in the North Sea off the coast of Essex. She was refloated and taken in to Sheerness, Kent in a sinking condition.
Nereid	France	The ship was driven ashore near Algeciras, Spain. She was on a voyage from Cette, Hérault to Rouen, Seine-Inférieure. She was refloated.
Ny Carleby	Russia	The full-rigged ship was driven ashore near the mouth of the Guadiana. She was on a voyage from Livorno, Grand Duchy of Tuscany to Hamburg. She was refloated with assistance from HMS Flamer (Royal Navy) and resumed her voyage.
St. Aubin	(United Kingdom of Great Britain and Ireland) Jersey	The ship was driven ashore near Algeciras. She was on a voyage from Marsala, Sicily to Jersey.
Treflig	Norway	The schooner was driven ashore at Gibraltar. She was on a voyage from Cette to Bremen. She was refloated the next day.

== 13 March ==
List of shipwrecks: 15 March 1845
Ship	State	Description
Little Avon	United Kingdom	The ship was driven ashore near Swanage, Dorset.
Norma	United Kingdom	The ship was driven ashore at Poole, Dorset. Her crew were rescued.
Scotswood	United Kingdom	The ship struck a sunken rock and was damaged at Cartagena, Spain. She was on a voyage from Newcastle upon Tyne, Northumberland to Cartagena.

== 14 March ==
List of shipwrecks: 14 March 1845
Ship	State	Description
Abram Thorn	United Kingdom	The schooner was wrecked on the east coast of Grand Manan, Nova Scotia, British North America. She was on a voyage from Digby, Nova Scotia to Boston, Massachusetts, United States.
Jean	United Kingdom	The ship struck the Isle Stone Rock and was wrecked near Bamborough Castle, Northumberland. Her crew were rescued. She was on a voyage from Newcastle upon Tyne, Northumberland to Bainsford, Stirlingshire.
Leonie	United Kingdom	The ship departed from Quebec City, Province of Canada, British North America for New York, United States. No further trace, presumed foundered with the loss of all hands.

== 15 March ==
List of shipwrecks: 15 March 1845
Ship	State	Description
Ann	United Kingdom	The ship was driven ashore at Wainfleet, Lincolnshire. She was on a voyage from King's Lynn, Norfolk to Wakefield, Yorkshire.
Jane	United Kingdom	The ship ran aground on the Swin Rocks and was damaged. She was on a voyage from Middlesbrough, Yorkshire to Sandwich, Kent. She was refloated and put in to Ramsgate, Kent in a leaky condition.
John and Margaret	United Kingdom	The ship was driven ashore at Ramsey, Isle of Man.
Joseph and Elizabeth	United Kingdom	The ship was driven ashore near Portland, Dorset.
Lee	United Kingdom	The barque was driven ashore near Portland.
Martha	United Kingdom	The sloop was lost in the North Sea off the coast of Lincolnshire with the loss of all hands. She was on a voyage from Boston, Lincolnshire to Goole, Yorkshire.
Monarch	United Kingdom	The steamship ran aground in the Scheldt. She was on a voyage from Antwerp, Belgium to Hull, Yorkshire. She was refloated and put back to Antwerp for repairs.
Pilgrim	United Kingdom	The ship was driven ashore at Seaton Snook, County Durham.

== 16 March ==
List of shipwrecks: 16 March 1845
Ship	State	Description
Sarah Jane	United Kingdom	The smack was abandoned in the Atlantic Ocean. Her crew were rescued. She was on a voyage from London to São Miguel Island, Azores.

== 17 March ==
List of shipwrecks: March 1845
Ship	State	Description
Findlater	United Kingdom	The ship was wrecked at Sea Palling, Norfolk with the loss of all but one of her crew. She was on a voyage from South Shields, County Durham to London.
Jane Easson	United Kingdom	The ship was driven ashore at Garrison Point, Kent. She was on a voyage from London to Newcastle upon Tyne, Northumberland. She was refloated and resumed her voyage.

== 18 March ==
List of shipwrecks: 18 March 1845
Ship	State	Description
Cæsar	United Kingdom	The ship was in collision with Howditch (United States) and foundered in the Atlantic Ocean. Her crew were rescued by Howditch. Cæsar was on a voyage from Ichaboe Island, Portuguese West Africa to Jersey, Channel Islands.
Falmouth	United Kingdom	The ship ran aground in the Lymington River.

== 19 March ==
List of shipwrecks: 19 March 1845
Ship	State	Description
Antigua Packet	(United Kingdom of Great Britain and Ireland) Saint Vincent	The drogher was wrecked in Fancy Bay, Saint Vincent. Her crew were rescued.
Chelsea	United States	The whaling ship was driven ashore on the north coast of New Zealand's Chatham Island. All crew were saved.
Gill	United Kingdom	The sloop was driven ashore at Port Ellen, Islay, Inner Hebrides.
Marchioness of Huntley	United Kingdom	The smack was driven ashore at Port Ellen.
Regent Packet	United Kingdom	The schooner was wrecked on Île de l'Est, Crozet Islands.
Three Brothers	United Kingdom	The ship was driven ashore at Wainfleet, Lincolnshire. She was on a voyage from King's Lynn, Norfolk to Wakefield, Yorkshire.

== 20 March ==
List of shipwrecks: 20 March 1845
Ship	State	Description
Alexander	United Kingdom	The ship was wrecked on the Haisborough Sands, in the North Sea off the coast of Norfolk. Her crew were rescued. She was on a voyage from Aberdeen to Valparaíso, Chile.
Alkanna Hendrika	Hamburg	The ship sprang a leak and was beached on Heligoland, where she was wrecked. She was on a voyage from Middlesbrough, Yorkshire to Altona.

== 21 March ==
List of shipwrecks: 21 March 1845
Ship	State	Description
Albion	United Kingdom	The ship was driven ashore at Maryport, Cumberland. She was on a voyage from Dublin to Maryport.
Ann and Catharine	United Kingdom	The ship was driven ashore at Caernarfon. Her crew were rescued. She was on a voyage from Liverpool, Lancashire to Caernarfon. She was refloated on 5 April and taken in to Caernarfon.
Elizabeth	United Kingdom	The ship was in collision with a sloop and foundered in the North Sea off St. Abb's Head, Berwickshire. Her crew were rescued.
Intimes	France	The brig was driven ashore at Gibraltar. She was on a voyage from Cette, Hérault to Rouen, Seine-Inférieure.
Nancy	United Kingdom	The ship was driven ashore at Maryport. She was on a voyage from Dublin to Maryport. She was refloated and taken in to Maryport.
Poland	United Kingdom	The ship was severely damaged by fire in the Clyde. She was on a voyage from Sunderland, County Durham to the Clyde.
Thompson	United Kingdom	The ship ran aground on the Grain Spit, off the Kent coast. She was refloated the next day and resumed her voyage to Sunderland.

== 22 March ==
List of shipwrecks: 22 March 1845
Ship	State	Description
Albion	United Kingdom	The ship was driven ashore and damaged at Maryport, Cumberland. She was refloated on 24 March.
Intionce	Flag unknown	The ship was driven ashore at Gibraltar. She was refloated on 29 March and departed for Rouen, Seine-Inférieure, France.
John Knox	United Kingdom	The East Indiaman was wrecked on the Goodwin Sands, Kent. Her crew were rescued by the lugger Industry (United Kingdom). She was on a voyage from Bombay, India to London
Swan	United Kingdom	The ship was driven ashore and damaged at "Killen". She was on a voyage from Oban, Argyllshire to Liverpool, Lancashire.
Waterwitch	United Kingdom	The ship struck a sunken rock off Guernsey, Channel Islands. She was on a voyage from Guernsey to Newport, Monmouthshire. Waterwitch consequently put in to Saint Sampson, Guernsey.

== 23 March ==
List of shipwrecks: 23 March 1845
Ship	State	Description
Azorian	United Kingdom	The schooner was driven ashore at "Baggy-leap", Glamorgan. She was on a voyage from Hayle, Cornwall to Neath, Glamorgan. She was refloated and resumed her voyage.
Cumberland	United Kingdom	The ship ran aground on the Goodwin Sands, Kent. She was on a voyage from Marseille, Bouches-du-Rhône, France to King's Lynn, Norfolk. She was refloated and taken in to Margate, Kent in a leaky condition.
Gale	United Kingdom	The ship ran aground between the Grain Spit and the Nore, off the coast of Kent. She was on a voyage from Odesa to London. She was refloated and taken in to Stangate Creek.
Margaret	United Kingdom	The ship was driven ashore on Flotta, Orkney Islands. She was on a voyage from Banff, Aberdeenshire to Loch Browne. She was refloated on 27 March and taken in to Stromness in a severely damaged condition.
Norham Castle	United Kingdom	The ship was driven ashore in the Dardanelles.
Oakland	United Kingdom	The ship was driven ashore and wrecked 11 nautical miles (20 km) south of Holyhead, Anglesey with the loss of two of her crew. She was on a voyage from New Orleans, Louisiana, United States to Holyhead.
Perdvitos	Russia	The sloop was wrecked at Chale, Isle of Wight, United Kingdom. Her crew were rescued. She was on a voyage from Lisbon, Portugal to a Russian port.
Royalist	United Kingdom	The ship was driven ashore and damaged near Sunderland, County Durham.
Siam	United Kingdom	The East Indiaman, a barque, ran aground and sank off Compton, Isle of Wight with the loss of two lives. She was on a voyage from Calcutta, India to London.
Union	United Kingdom	The ship was driven ashore at Dover, Kent. She was on a voyage from Mauritius to London. She was refloated and taken in to The Downs.

== 24 March ==
List of shipwrecks: 24 March 1845
Ship	State	Description
Clifton	United Kingdom	The barque caught fire and sank at Cobh, County Cork.
Horwood	United Kingdom	The ship was driven ashore and wrecked in Algoa Bay.
Petite	France	The ship was driven ashore at Dungeness, Kent, United Kingdom. She was on a voyage from Bordeaux, Gironde to Dunkirk, Nord. She was refloated on 4 April and taken in to Dover, Kent.
Phillips	United Kingdom	The barque was wrecked on "Bona Vista Island". Her crew survived.
Regent Packet	(United Kingdom of Great Britain and Ireland) Cape Colony	The ship was wrecked on Possession Island, Portuguese West Africa. There were survivors.
Sir Robert Peel	United Kingdom	The brig ran aground off Ambleteuse, Pas-de-Calais, France. Her crew were rescued. She was on a voyage from Southampton, Hampshire to Sunderland, County Durham. She was refloated on 7 April and taken in to Boulogne.
Trinidad	United Kingdom	The ship was driven ashore and wrecked west of Boulogne, Pas-de-Calais. All on board were rescued. She was on a voyage from Manila, Spanish East Indies to London.

== 25 March ==
List of shipwrecks: 25 March 1845
Ship	State	Description
Catherine	United Kingdom	The ship was damaged by fire at Whitby, Yorkshire.
Forager	United Kingdom	The ship ran aground on the Holme Sand, in the Humber. She was on a voyage from Hull, Yorkshire to Saint John, New Brunswick, British North America.
Gertruida	Hamburg	The ship foundered in the North Sea off Texel, North Holland, Netherlands. She was on a voyage from Cardiff, Glamorgan, United Kingdom to Hamburg.

== 26 March ==
List of shipwrecks: 26 March 1845
Ship	State	Description
Chieftain	United Kingdom	The barque ran aground at Angra Peguena, Portuguese West Africa. She was put under repair with assistance from HMS Thunderbolt (Royal Navy). She later departed for Liverpool, Lancashire but subsequently foundered.
Jane	United Kingdom	The ship was wrecked at Redcar, Yorkshire. She was on a voyage from Blyth, Northumberland to Filey, Yorkshire.
Janet	United Kingdom	The ship was driven onto the Goodwin Sands, Kent. She was refloated and taken in to The Downs. She was on a voyage from South Shields, County Durham to Constantinople, Ottoman Empire.
Lucy	United Kingdom	The ship was wrecked at Milltown Malbay, County Clare with the loss of all six of her crew. She was on a voyage from Limerick to Preston, Lancashire.

== 27 March ==
List of shipwrecks: 27 March 1845
Ship	State	Description
Anna	United Kingdom	The barque was driven ashore at Dungeness, Kent. She was on a voyage from South Shields, County Durham to Cartagena, Spain. She was refloated and taken in to The Downs. She was abandoned the next day and sank.
Betsey Lloyd	United Kingdom	The ship ran aground and was damaged at Chepstow, Monmouthshire. She was on a voyage from Chepstow to Londonderry. She was refloated but consequently had to be beached.
Joanna	United Kingdom	The ship ran aground on the Barber Sand, in the North Sea off the coast of Norfolk. She was refloated and resumed her voyage.
Suez	United Kingdom	The ship was wrecked at "Sudher" with the loss of all hands. She was on a voyage from Limerick to "Turbett".
Thomas Lowery	United Kingdom	The full-rigged ship struck a sunken rock. She put in to Dartmouth, Devon, where she sank. She was on a voyage from Sydney, New South Wales to London. The pilot on board at the time committed suicide the next day. She was refloated on 7 April and beached for repairs.
Tod	United Kingdom	The sloop was in collision with another sloop in the North Sea. Both vessels sank; all hands on board Tod were lost. Tod was ohn a voyage from South Shields, County Durham to Leith, Lothian.
Torrinha	Portugal	The ship was driven ashore near Boulogne, Pas-de-Calais, France. Her crew were rescued. She was on a voyage from Lisbon to Hamburg. She was refloated on 7 April and taken in to Boulogne.

== 28 March ==
List of shipwrecks: 28 March 1845
Ship	State	Description
Anna	United Kingdom	The ship sank in The Downs. Her crew survived. She was on a voyage from South Shields, County Durham to Cartagena, Spain.
Blessing	United Kingdom	The ship foundered in the North Sea off Flamborough Head, Yorkshire. Her crew were rescued.
Brunswick	United Kingdom	The ship was wrecked at Flamborough Head. Her crew were rescued by Prospect (United Kingdom).
Edward	United Kingdom	The ship was in collision with John Burrell (United Kingdom) and foundered in the North Sea off Bawdsey, Suffolk with the loss of two of her crew. She was on a voyage from South Shields to London.
Hearts of Oak	United Kingdom	The ship was driven ashore at Spurn Point, Yorkshire. She was on a voyage from Scarborough, Yorkshire to Hull, Yorkshire.
Leonidas	United Kingdom	The schooner was driven ashore near Port Patrick, Wigtownshire. Her crew were rescued.
Providence	United Kingdom	The ship sprang a leak and foundered in the North Sea. Her crew were rescued.
Ravenswood	United Kingdom	The ship ran aground at Whitehaven, Cumberland. She was on a voyage from Ichaboe Island, Portuguese West Africa to Whitehaven.
Rouennais	France	The ship was driven ashore at Dungeness, Kent, United Kingdom. She was on a voyage from Saint Domingo to Havre de Grâce, Seine-Inférieure. She was refloated.
Wilna	United Kingdom	The ship was driven ashore and wrecked 4 nautical miles (7.4 km) north of Flamborough Head. She was on a voyage from South Shields to Harfleur, Seine-Inférieure, France.

== 29 March ==
List of shipwrecks: 29 March 1845
Ship	State	Description
Gill	United Kingdom	The sloop was driven ashore at Port Ellen, Islay, Inner Hebrides.
Marchioness	United Kingdom	The smack was driven ashore at Port Ellen.
Merope	United Kingdom	The ship was driven ashore and wrecked in the Swan River.
Ovid	United Kingdom	The ship was driven ashore at Redcar, Yorkshire. She was on a voyage from Sunderland, County Durham to Margate, Kent. She was refloated and put in to Whitby, Yorkshire.
Russia	Russia	The ship was driven ashore by ice east of Stolpmünde, Prussia. She was on a voyage from "Baltic Port" to Stettin.
Schiedamsche Vissche	Netherlands	The ship was sunk by ice on the Hindered Sandbank. Her crew were rescued. She was on a voyage from Bordeaux, Gironde, France to Rotterdam, South Holland.

== 30 March ==
List of shipwrecks: 30 March 1845
Ship	State	Description
Archimedes	Hamburg	The ship ran aground and sank on the Vogelsand, in the North Sea. Her crew were rescued. She was on a voyage from Pernambuco, Brazil to Hamburg. She was refloated on 5 April and towed in to Cuxhaven.
Bengal	United Kingdom	The ship was wrecked on Seal Island, British North America. Her crew were rescued. She was on a voyage from London to. Saint John, New Brunswick, British North America.
Betsey	United Kingdom	The ship was damaged by fire in the River Thames.
Margaret	United Kingdom	The sloop was in collision with the schooner Celerity (United Kingdom) and sank off Grimsby, Lincolnshire with the loss of her captain. She was on a voyage from Goole, Yorkshire to London. Margaret was refloated on 1 April; She was taken in to Grimsby on 3 April.
Marys	United Kingdom	The ship was driven ashore and damaged at Stranraer, Wigtownshire. She was on a voyage from Liverpool, Lancashire to the Clyde.
Memel Packet I	Prussia	The ship sprang a leak and was abandoned in the Baltic Sea off "Schonewald". She was on a voyage from Stettin to Memel.
Peru	United Kingdom	The schooner was driven ashore near Warrenpoint, County Down. She was on a voyage from Dundalk, County Louth to Liverpool, Lancashire. She was refloated on 1 April and taken in to Warrenpoint for repairs.
Providence	United Kingdom	The ship collided with a brig and foundered in the North Sea off the mouth of the Humber. She was on a voyage from London to South Shields, County Durham. The brig also foundered with the loss of all hands.
Thomas Parker	United Kingdom	The ship was driven ashore at Stranraer. She was on a voyage from Whitehaven, Cumberland to Dublin.
Three Johns	United Kingdom	The ship was driven ashore at Spurn Point, East Riding of Yorkshire. She was on a voyage from King's Lynn, Norfolk to Liverpool.

== 31 March ==
List of shipwrecks: 31 March 1845
Ship	State	Description
Alexander	United Kingdom	The brig was lost in the Farne Islands, Northumberland. Her crew were rescued.
Egeria	United Kingdom	The ship was driven ashore north of Workington, Cumberland.
Isabella	United Kingdom	The ship foundered in the North Sea 10 nautical miles (19 km) off Spurn Point, Yorkshire with the loss of all hands. She was on a voyage from Sligo to London.
Jane and Susan	United Kingdom	The ship caspized and sank at Dublin. Her crew were rescued. She was on a voyage from Newry, County Antrim to Dublin.
John and Mary	United Kingdom	The ship foundered in Saltoun Bay with the loss of all but her captain from her four crew. She was on a voyage from Belfast, County Antrim to Dundrum, County Down.
Mary	United Kingdom	The ship was driven ashore at Stranraer, Wigtownshire. She was on a voyage from Liverpool, Lancashire to the Clyde.
Tamerlane	United Kingdom	The ship was driven ashore south of Fraserburgh, Aberdeenshire. She was on a voyage from London to the River Spey. She was refloated and beached at Fraserburgh.
Thomas Parker	United Kingdom	The ship was driven ashore at Stranraer. She was on a voyage from Dublin to Whitehaven, Cumberland.

== Unknown date ==
List of shipwrecks: Unknown date in March 1845
Ship	State	Description
Ann Mondell	United Kingdom	The ship was lost about 40 nautical miles (74 km) from Pernambuco, Brazil. She was on a voyage from Ichaboe Island, Portuguese West Africa to Pernambuco.
Austria	United Kingdom	The brig ran aground on the Kentish Knock. She was refloated on 18 March.
Barnesby	United Kingdom	The ship was driven ashore at Lowestoft, Suffolk. She was refloated on 23 March and taken in to Great Yarmouth, Norfolk.
Bolina	United Kingdom	The ship was driven ashore and wrecked at Winterton-on-Sea, Norfolk before 12 March.
Condor	Flag unknown	The ship was driven ashore by ice at "Korsstack". She was refloated on 20 March and taken in to Cuxhaven.
Cypress	United Kingdom	The ship was run down and sunk off Cádiz, Spain by a schooner. Her crew were rescued by Hawksbill (United Kingdom).
Endeavour	United Kingdom	The ship ran aground off Orfordness, Suffolk. She was refloated on 2 April and taken in to Aldeburgh in a severely damaged condition.
Fox	United Kingdom	The ship was abandoned in the North Sea on or before 30 March.
Henriette	France	The brig struck the Cabezes Rock and was consequently beached near Tarifa, Spain, where she was wrecked.
Lucy Ann	United Kingdom	The ship was driven ashore at Kinsale, County Cork. She was on a voyage from Ichaboe Island, Portuguese West Africa to Cork. She was refloated on 12 March and towed in to Cork by HMS Dee (Royal Navy).
Margaret and Ann	(United Kingdom of Great Britain and Ireland) Isle of Man	The ship was driven ashore at Ramsey. She was refloated on 15 March.
Melvire	Spain	The ship was lost at Cape St. Paul, Dahomey in early March.
Merchant	United Kingdom	The schooner was abandoned before 8 March; she foundered on that date.
Myrtle	United Kingdom	The ship was driven ashore at Harwich, Essex. She was on a voyage from Goole, Yorkshire to London. She was refloated on 16 March and taken in to Harwich.
Ocean	United Kingdom	The ship was driven ashore at St. Bees Head, Cumberland in late March. She was refloated and taken in to Maryport.
Paris	United States	The fishing schooner was lost on the Georges Bank. Lost with all 8 hands.
Phillips	United Kingdom	The ship was wrecked on "Bona Vista". She was on a voyage from Liverpool, Lancashire to Valparaíso, Chile.
Princess Royal	United Kingdom	The ship was wrecked on the Scroby Sands, Norfolk before 10 March.
Prosperity	United Kingdom	The ship was driven ashore and wrecked on Ynys Llandwyn, Anglesey before 20 March. She was on a voyage from Waterford to Liverpool.
Sally	United Kingdom	The schooner ran aground on the Maplin Sand, in the North Sea off the coast of Essex. She was refloated on 18 March.
Samuel and Sarah	United Kingdom	The brig ran aground on the Nore or the Jenkin Sand. Her crew were rescued. She was on a voyage from South Shields, County Durham to London. She was refloated on 18 March.
Sea Adventure	United Kingdom	The ship was driven ashore at Lowestoft. She was refloated on 23 March and taken in to Great Yarmouth.
Water Lily	United Kingdom	The ship ran aground on the Brake Sand, in the North Sea in late March. She was on a voyage form London to Gloucester. She was refloated and resumed her voyage.
William	United Kingdom	The ship was driven ashore at "Llandroynn", Wales. She was refloated on 23 March and resumed her voyage.
