= Penguin Islands =

Namibian archipelago

Penguin Islands Pikkewyn-eilande Pinguininseln 'Off-Shore islands'
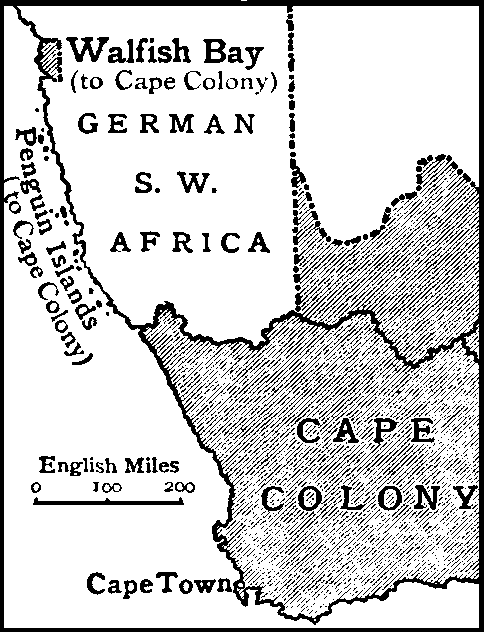
- Penguin Islands on a 1911 Cape Colony map.
- Interactive map of Penguin Islands; Pikkewyn-eilande; Pinguininseln 'Off-Shore islands'

Geography
- Location: Atlantic Ocean
- Archipelago: Scattered coastal islands
- Total islands: Over 24, including rocks awash
- Major islands: Possession Island, Penguin Island and Seal Island

Administration
- Namibia

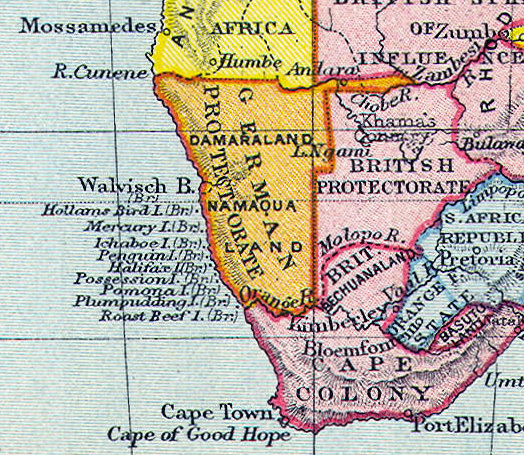
The Penguin Islands on an 1897 map section.

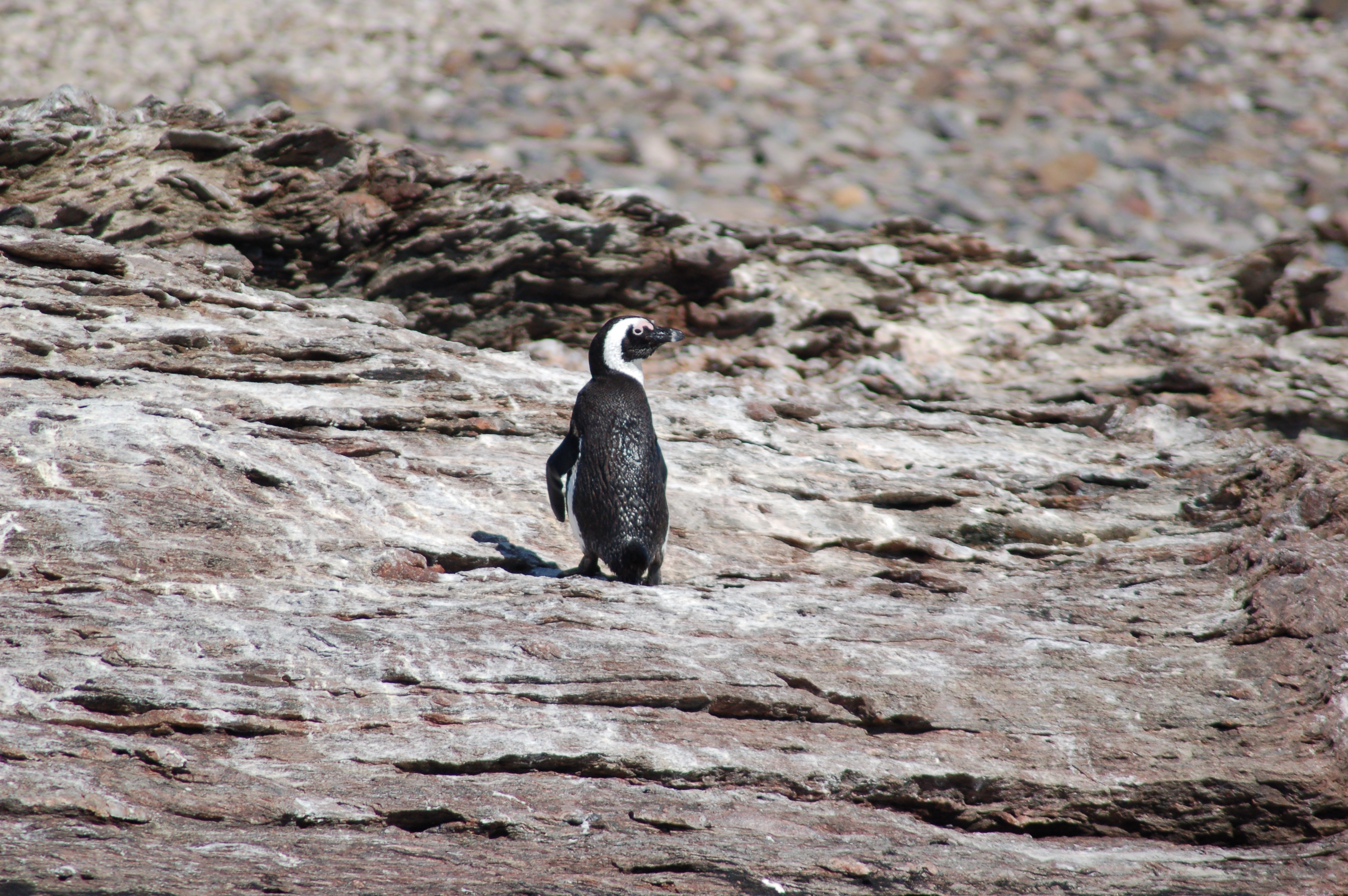
African penguins.

The Penguin Islands (Afrikaans: Pikkewyn-eilande, German: Pinguininseln) are a historical group of mostly scattered small islands and rocks situated along a 355 kilometres (221 mi) long stretch of the Namibian coastline. Not forming a geographic whole, the Namibian government formally lists them as the off-Shore islands. Their name comes from the presence of African penguins which inhabit the coastal region surrounding Namibia and South Africa.

== Geography ==
The islands are scattered along a long coastal region. Although a few of them form small clusters or groups, such as the islands in Lüderitz Bay, the Penguin Islands lack the mutual proximity of a natural archipelago or island chain.

The largest island is Possession Island with 0.90 km^{2} (0.35 sq mi) in area. Hollam's Bird Island is the most northern and, at a distance of 10.3 kilometres (6.4 mi), the farthest from the coast. All islands together measure 2.35 km^{2} (0.91 sq mi) in area.

=== Islands ===
Listed from the most northern to the most southern, the islands include the Penguin Islands (in the historic, narrower sense - printed in bold):

- **Hollam's Bird Island** (24°38′21″S 14°31′52″E)
- **Mercury Island** (25°43′10″S 14°49′59″E)
- **Ichaboe Island** (26°17′20″S 14°56′12″E)
- Black Rock (26°5′0″S 14°58′0″E)
- Staple Rock (26°22′0″S 14°58′0″E)
- Marshall Reef (26°22′0″S 14°58′0″E)
- Boat Bay Rocks (26°25′0″S 15°5′0″E)
- **Seal Island** , Lüderitz Bay (26°35′45″S 15°9′22″E)
- **Penguin Island**, Lüderitz Bay (26°37′0″S 15°9′15″E)
- **Halifax Island** (26°39′3″S 15°4′47″E)
- **North Long Island** (26°49′14″S 15°7′32″E)
- **South Long Island** (26°49′57″S 15°7′41″E)
- **Possession Island** (27°0′49″S 15°11′40″E)
- **Albatross Island** (27°7′9″S 15°14′18″E)
- **Pomona Island** (27°11′37″S 15°15′29″E)
- Black Rock (24°56′0″S 14°48′0″E)
- Black Sophie Rock (27°38′0″S 15°31′0″E)
- **Plumpudding Island** (27°38′31″S 15°30′49″E)
- **Sinclair Island** (Roast Beef Island) (27°39′56″S 15°31′13″E)
- Little Roastbeef Islets (27°42′0″S 15°32′0″E)

== History ==
Uninhabited, strategically located, rich in guano deposits and even offshore diamond fields, the islands had considerable value for their size. They were visited by European traders from the 17th century onwards, primarily for the valuable guano. Between 1861 and 1867 they were annexed by Britain, and then in 1873 by the Cape Colony. International confusion over the legality of the transfer required Prime Minister John Molteno of the Cape Colony to reaffirm the annexation later, with the Ichaboe and Penguin Islands Act (1874).

The annexation was originally intended to form part of an overall absorption of South West Africa into the Cape Colony forming one locally governed British colony. This was to be instituted by the Palgrave Commission (1876).

British interference and the resulting breakdown in relations between the British Empire and the local Cape government obstructed the Commission's work long enough for Germany to declare South West Africa a German protectorate in 1884 as part of the continent-wide Scramble for Africa. The offshore islands (and Walvis Bay) were excluded from German administration by their status as Cape constituencies. This status was recognised by Germany in 1886. Thus, although close to the mainland, the islands were not part of German South West Africa.

In 1990, South West Africa gained independence as Namibia. The Penguin Islands remained under South African sovereignty, thus letting it retain an Exclusive Economic Zone off the Namibian coast. After further negotiation and the signing of a treaty, at midnight on 28 February 1994, sovereignty over the islands, as well as Walvis Bay, was transferred to Namibia.
