= List of shipwrecks in February 1845 =

The list of shipwrecks in February 1845 includes ships sunk, foundered, wrecked, grounded, or otherwise lost during February 1845.

== 1 February ==
List of shipwrecks: 1 February 1845
Ship	State	Description
Anne Catherine	Sweden	The galeas was holed by ice and sank off Aalborg, Denmark. Her crew were rescued. She was on a voyage from Newcastle upon Tyne, Northumberland, United Kingdom to Fårö.
Antilles	United Kingdom	The ship was driven ashore at Formby, Lancashire. She was on a voyage from Valparaíso, Chile to Liverpool, Lancashire. She was refloated and taken in to Liverpool.
Belize	United Kingdom	The brig ran aground on the Buttoness Lights. She was refloated and taken in to Dundee, Forfarshire.
Breeze	United Kingdom	The ship was driven ashore north of Cley-next-the-Sea, Norfolk, Her crew were rescued. She was on a voyage from Marseille, Bouches-du-Rhône, France to King's Lynn, Norfolk.
Ceylon	United Kingdom	The ship was wrecked on Key Vast, in the Old Bahama Channel with the loss of a crew member. She was on a voyage from Liverpool to Havana, Cuba.
Jaacht Haabet	Denmark	The ship was driven ashore in the Præstø Fjord near Tedehagen. She was on a voyage from Copenhagen to "Sarkjobing".
Jane	United Kingdom	The sloop foundered in the North Sea off the mouth of the Humber. Her crew were rescued by Jupiter (United Kingdom). Jane was on a voyage from Beccles, Suffolk to Goole, Yorkshire.
Litherana	United Kingdom	The ship ran aground off "Hornbeck".

== 2 February ==
List of shipwrecks: 2 February 1845
Ship	State	Description
Ana Wood	United Kingdom	The ship was driven ashore and wrecked at Staithes, Yorkshire. Her crew were rescued. She was on a voyage from South Shields, County Durham to Ipswich, Suffolk.
Clarinda	United Kingdom	The ship was driven ashore and wrecked on Barra, Outer Hebrides. Her crew were rescued. She was on a voyage from Quebec City, Province of Canada, British North America to Dublin.
Harmony	(United Kingdom of Great Britain and Ireland) Isle of Man	The ship was wrecked on the Glasheady Shoal, near Londonderry with the loss of all thirteen of her crew.
Ville de Lyons	United States	The ship was driven ashore at Montfarville, Manche, France. She was on a voyage from Havre de Grâce, Seine Maritime to New York. She was refloated on 4 April and taken in to Saint-Vaast-la-Hougue, Manche.

== 4 February ==
List of shipwrecks: 4 February 1845
Ship	State	Description
Azores Packet	United Kingdom	The schooner capsized in the Irish Sea off Ceybur, Pembrokeshire.
Helen	United Kingdom	The ship sprang a leak and was abandoned in the North Sea off Coquet Island, Northumberland. She was on a voyage from Middlesbrough, North Riding of Yorkshire to Leith, Lothian. She was subsequently taken in to Warkworth, Northumberland.
Mozambique	United Kingdom	The ship was driven ashore on Partridge Island, Nova Scotia, British North America. She was on a voyage from Saint John, New Brunswick, British North America to Hull, Yorkshire. She was refloated the next day.
Nancy	United Kingdom	The ship ran aground on the Nidingen Reef and was wrecked.

== 5 February ==
List of shipwrecks: 5 February 1845
Ship	State	Description
Admiral Colpoys	United Kingdom	The schooner was wrecked on the south east coast of Martinique. Her crew were rescued. She was on a voyage from Bermuda to Saint Vincent.
Alexander Robinson	United Kingdom	The brig was driven ashore and wrecked on Crooked Island, Bahamas. Her crew were rescued. She was on a voyage from Cuba to Swansea, Glamorgan.
Amelia	(United Kingdom of Great Britain and Ireland) British North America	The schooner was driven ashore and wrecked on Crooked Island. Her crew were rescued.
Avance	Norway	The ship ran aground off Domesnes.
Caroline	United Kingdom	The ship was driven ashore at Montevideo, Uruguay. She was refloated on 16 February and put in to Buenos Aires, Argentina.
Cette	France	The ship was driven ashore and wrecked at Montevideo.
Cobbino or Cobrero	United Kingdom	The ship was driven ashore and wrecked on Crooked Island. Her crew were rescued. She was on a voyage from Cuba to Swansea.
Confidence	United Kingdom	The ship was driven ashore at Tarbert, Argyllshire. She was on a voyage from Bristol, Gloucestershire to Limerick. She was refloated and completed her voyage the next day.
Hornet	United Kingdom	The ship was wrecked on the Sand Hale, in the North Sea. She was on a voyage from Middlesbrough, Yorkshire to Great Yarmouth, Norfolk.
Lord Glenelg	United Kingdom	The brig capsized at South Shields, County Durham.
Sophie	Norway	The ship was driven ashore at Thisted, Denmark. Her crew were rescued. She was on a voyage from Newcastle upon Tyne, Northumberland, United Kingdom to Moss, Norway.

== 6 February ==
List of shipwrecks: 6 February 1845
Ship	State	Description
Ardent	United Kingdom	The ship ran aground at Wicklow.
Ellen	Belgium	The ship was driven ashore at Ostend, West Flanders. She was on a voyage from Nieuwpoort to Ostend.
Liverpool	United Kingdom	The ship was driven ashore 3 nautical miles (5.6 km) south of Bridlington, Yorkshire. Her crew were rescued. She subsequently became a wreck.
Maese Packet	United Kingdom	The ship was abandoned in the North Sea off Lindisfarne, Northumberland. She subsequently came ashore at Ross, Northumberland. She was on a voyage from South Shields, County Durham to Grangemouth, Stirlingshire.
M. Angelo	Spain	The ship departed from Cartagena for Havre de Grâce, Seine-Inférieure. Subsequently lost.
Reaper	United Kingdom	The ship ran aground and capsized in the River Witham at Boston, Lincolnshire. She was on a voyage from Boston to Glasgow, Renfrewshire.
True Blue	United Kingdom	The ship was driven ashore and wrecked at Skinningrove, Yorkshire with the loss of all hands.

== 7 February ==
List of shipwrecks: 7 February 1845
Ship	State	Description
Cigar	United Kingdom	The barque caught fire off Ceará, Brazil and was abandoned by her crew. She was on a voyage from Ceará to Liverpool, Lancashire. She subsequently came ashore and was wrecked.
Columbian	United Kingdom	The barque was wrecked in the Straits of Gaspar. All on board were rescued. She was on a voyage from Sydney, New South Wales to Singapore.
Emerald	United Kingdom	The schooner ran aground on the Barnard Sand, in the North Sea off the coast of Suffolk. Her crew were rescued by the Kessingland Lifeboat. She was on a voyage from London to Aberdeen. Emerald broke up on 10 February.
Lamb	United Kingdom	The ship was driven ashore and wrecked near Wainfleet, Lincolnshire. Her crew were rescued.
Risk	United Kingdom	The brig ran aground on the Gabbard Sand, in the North Sea. She floated off but foundered off the Galloper Sand. Her crew were rescued by Horam (United Kingdom). Risk was on a voyage from Sunderland, County Durham to Portsmouth, Hampshire.
Sampson	United Kingdom	The steam tug was driven ashore in the Great Stour at Sandwich, Kent. She was refloated the next day and taken in to Ramsgate, Kent.

== 8 February ==
List of shipwrecks: 8 February 1845
Ship	State	Description
Augustine et Celine	France	The brig was wrecked in the Dardanelles. Her crew were rescued.
Hoop en de Herstelling	Netherlands	The ship was wrecked on the North Rock, off the coast of County Down, Great Britain. Her crew were rescued. She was on a voyage from Rotterdam, South Holland to Belfast, County Antrim, United Kingdom.
Sheffield	United States	The ship was driven ashore on Long Island, New York. She was on a voyage from New York City to Hull, Yorkshire, United Kingdom. She was refloated on 10 February and taken in the New York City.
Wood Park	United Kingdom	The ship ran aground on the Barber Sand, in the North Sea off the coast of Norfolk. She was refloated and resumed her voyage.

== 9 February ==
List of shipwrecks: 9 February 1845
Ship	State	Description
Gloria	Prussia	The ship was driven ashore near Cette, Hérault, France. Her crew were rescued.
Lord Keane	United Kingdom	The ship ran aground and was damaged at Ichaboe Island, Portuguese West Africa.
Rotherham	United Kingdom	The schooner was driven ashore at North Somercotes, Lincolnshire. She was on a voyage from London to Goole, Yorkshire.
Somerville	United Kingdom	The ship was driven ashore in the Dardanelles.

== 10 February ==
List of shipwrecks: 10 February 1845
Ship	State	Description
Alexander	United Kingdom	The ship was driven ashore between Hurst Castle and Lymington, Hampshire. She was on a voyage from Llanelly, Glamorgan to Portsmouth, Hampshire. She was refloated the next day.
Ann and Ellen	United Kingdom	The ship ran aground at South Shields, County Durham and was severely damaged. She was refloated.
Bee	United Kingdom	The ship was driven ashore near Rye, Sussex. Her crew were rescued by a boat of the Coast Guard from Camber. She was refloated the next day and taken in to Rye.
Betsey	United Kingdom	The ship was wrecked at Whitburn, County Durham. Her crew survived.
Emily	United Kingdom	The schooner was wrecked 1 nautical mile (1.9 km) south of Scarborough, Yorkshire. She was on a voyage from Wisbech, Cambridgeshire to Middlesbrough, Yorkshire.
Hannah	United Kingdom	The schooner was driven ashore at Whitburn. She was refloated and towed in to South Shields.
Henry	United Kingdom	The barque caught fire at Blackwall, Middlesex. She was towed to Greenwich, Kent where she was beached and burnt out.
Jane Grey	United Kingdom	The ship was wrecked on West Falkland, Falkland Islands. Her crew survived.
Martin	United Kingdom	The collier, a brig, was wrecked on the Gaa Sand, in the North Sea off the coast of Forfarshire with the loss of all ten crew. She was on a voyage from Newcastle upon Tyne, Northumberland to Dundee, Forfarshire.
Mary	United Kingdom	The ship was driven ashore at Whitburn.
Mexico	United Kingdom	The ship ran aground and was damaged at Blyth, Northumberland. She was later refloated and taken in to South Shields in a leaky condition.
Misty	United Kingdom	The ship was driven ashore and wrecked south of Scarborough, Yorkshire. She was on a voyage from London to "Middlested".
Naiad	United Kingdom	The ship was wrecked on the Hench Rocks, on the coast of County Durham.
Reliance	United Kingdom	The ship ran aground near the Collie Rock and was damaged. She was refloated and taken in to Banff, Aberdeenshire.
St. Andrews	United Kingdom	The brigantine was wrecked on the Annat Sands. Her crew were rescued by the Montrose Lifeboat. She was on a voyage from Newcastle upon Tyne to Arbroath, Forfarshire.
Tyne	United Kingdom	The schooner was driven ashore and severely damaged at Bellman's Head, near Stonehaven, Aberdeenshire. Her crew were rescued by the Stonehave pilot boat.
Unduly	United Kingdom	The ship ran aground off the Mumbles, Glamorgan. She was on a voyage from Swansea, Glamorgan to Cuba. She was refloated and put back to Swansea.
Unity	United Kingdom	The ship sank 1 nautical mile (1.9 km) south of Scarborough, Yorkshire. Her crew were rescued. She was on a voyage from London to Middlesbrough, Yorkshire.
Victoria	United Kingdom	The ship struck a rock and sank in Ramsey Bay. Her crew were rescued. She was on a voyage from Pentewan, Cornwall to Runcorn, Cheshire.

== 11 February ==
List of shipwrecks: 11 February 1845
Ship	State	Description
Defiance	United Kingdom	The schooner was driven ashore at Tynemouth, Northumberland. She was refloated on 18 February and towed in to the River Tyne.
Duc Sorelli	Spain	The ship was in collision with Carlota ( Kingdom of the Two Sicilies) and sank off Cartagena, Spain. Her crew were rescued. She was on a voyage from Alicante to Gibraltar.
Euphemia	France	The ship was driven ashore and wrecked in Robin Hood's Bay. Her crew were rescued. She was refloated on 21 February and taken in to Whitby, Yorkshire in a severely damaged condition.
Grand Turk	United States	The brig was driven ashore at Gibraltar. She was on a voyage from Cádiz, Spain to the Rio Grande. She was consequently condemned.
Harmonie	Netherlands	The ship ran aground on the Scheelhoek, off the Dutch coast.
Juliana	United Kingdom	The ship was driven ashore and wrecked in Robin Hoods Bay. Her crew were rescued.
Sir R. A. Ferguson	United Kingdom	The ship was in collision with Hopewell (United Kingdom) and foundered off the Tuskar Rock with the loss of two of her crew. Survivors were rescued by Hopewell. Sir R. A. Ferguson was on a voyage from Glasgow, Renfrewshire to Malta.
Star	United Kingdom	The ship was driven ashore and wrecked in Robin Hoods Bay. Her crew were rescued. She was on a voyage from King's Lynn, Norfolk to Port Dundas, Renfrewshire. She was refloated on 21 February and taken in to Whitby in a severely damaged condition.

== 12 February ==
List of shipwrecks: 12 February 1845
Ship	State	Description
Active	United Kingdom	The ship ran aground at South Shields, County Durham. She was on a voyage from Hull, Yorkshire to Hull.
Burley	United Kingdom	The ship was driven ashore 4 nautical miles (7.4 km) north of Arklow, County Wicklow. She was on a voyage from Liverpool, Lancashire to Ichaboe Island, Portuguese West Africa. She was refloated on 16 February but was again driven ashore. She was refloated on 13 March and towed in to the River Liffey by the steamship Adelina (United Kingdom).
King of the Netherlands	United Kingdom	The ship was damaged by fire in the River Thames near the entrance to the Surrey Canal at Rotherhithe, Kent.
President	United Kingdom	The steam tug was driven ashore at Liverpool whilst attempting to refloat Valparaiso (United Kingdom).
Victoria	United Kingdom	The steam tug was driven ashore at Liverpool whilst attempting to refloat Valparaiso (United Kingdom).

== 13 February ==
List of shipwrecks: 13 February 1845
Ship	State	Description
Alciope	United Kingdom	The ship was driven ashore north of Workington, Cumberland. She was on a voyage from Swansea, Glamorgan to Whitehaven, Cumberland.
Diligent	United Kingdom	The ship was in collision with Saracen (United Kingdom and sank off Dungarvan, County Waterford. Her crew were rescued. She was on a voyage from Liverpool, Lancashire to Alexandria, Egypt Eyalet.
Freedom	United Kingdom	The ship ran aground on the Kentish Knock and sank. Her crew were rescued. She was on a voyage from Gibraltar to South Shields, County Durham.
Jeune Edmond	France	The ship was in collision with Gilbert Henderson (United Kingdom) and foundered in the Atlantic Ocean. Her crew were rescued.
Samson	United Kingdom	The ship was driven ashore at Seaton, Devon.
Samuel Press	United Kingdom	The ship was driven ashore at Great Yarmouth, Norfolk. She was on a voyage from King's Lynn, Norfolk to Liverpool. She was refloated and taken in to Great Yarmouth.

== 14 February ==
List of shipwrecks: 145 February 1845
Ship	State	Description
Griphia	United Kingdom	The ship was wrecked at Saint-Quentin-en-Tourmont, Somme, France. Her crew were rescued. She was on a voyage from St. Ubes, Portugal to Cork.
Lady Faversham	United Kingdom	The ship ran aground in the Cockle Gat. She was refloated and taken in to The Downs.
Mary Jean	United Kingdom	The ship was run aground on the Long Sand, in the Boston Deeps. She was on a voyage from Wisbech, Cambridgeshire to London. She was refloated and towed in to Sutton Bridge, Lincolnshire.
Yare	(United Kingdom of Great Britain and Ireland) New South Wales	The brig ran aground on the Troubridge Shoal. She was refloated on 16 February.

== 15 February ==
List of shipwrecks: 15 February 1845
Ship	State	Description
Bon Père	France	The ship was wrecked near Ténès, Algeria. Her crew were rescued. She was on a voyage from Marseille, Bouches-du-Rhône to Ténès.
California	United Kingdom	The barque ran aground the Isle of Pines, Cuba. She was on a voyage from Demerara, British Guiana to New Orleans, Louisiana, United States
Jane and Sarah	United Kingdom	The ship was driven ashore in Ross Bay. Her crew were rescued.

== 16 February ==
List of shipwrecks: 16 February 1845
Ship	State	Description
Coquette	United Kingdom	The ship was driven ashore and wrecked near Prospect, Nova Scotia, British North America. Her crew were rescued.
Fortune	United Kingdom	The ship was driven ashore on Grand Manan, New Brunswick, British North America with the loss of a crew member. She was on a voyage from London to Saint John, New Brunswick.
Hellenie	Grand Duchy of Tuscany	The brig ran aground on the Vada Shoal and foundered. Her crew were rescued. She was on a voyage from Varna, Ottoman Empire to Constantinople and Livorno.

== 18 February ==
List of shipwrecks: 18 February 1845
Ship	State	Description
Amaranth	(United Kingdom of Great Britain and Ireland) British North America	The schooner was wrecked in the Bahamas. Her crew were rescued.
Enterprise	United Kingdom	The full-rigged ship was wrecked in the Bahamas. Her crew were rescued. She was on a voyage from New Orleans, Louisiana to Liverpool, Lancashire.

== 19 February ==
List of shipwrecks: 19 February 1845
Ship	State	Description
Hibernia	United Kingdom	The schooner capsized in Carnarvon Bay with the loss of all four of her crew. She was subsequently taken in to "Porthlerdy".
Sally	United Kingdom	The ship was driven ashore near Lowestoft, Suffolk. She was refloated and resumed her voyage.

== 20 February ==
List of shipwrecks: 20 February 1845
Ship	State	Description
Ceres	Hamburg	The galeas ran aground on the Steff Sand, in the North Sea. She was refloated on 24 February but consequently foundered in the Elbe. Her crew were rescued. She was on a voyage from Stockton-on-Tees, County Durham, United Kingdom to Hamburg.
Emmeline	France	The whaler was abandoned off Mauritius. She was boarded the next day by men from HMS Conway (Royal Navy) and taken in to port there.
Lord Ashburton	United Kingdom	The ship caught fire at Charleston, South Carolina, United States and was scuttled. Subsequently refloated, repaired and returned to service.

== 21 February ==
List of shipwrecks: 21 February 1845
Ship	State	Description
Enterprise	United Kingdom	The ship ran aground in the Sound of Mull. She was on a voyage from Liverpool, Lancashire to Newcastle upon Tyne, Northumberland. She was refloated and taken in to Tobermory, Isle of Mull.
Friendship	United Kingdom	The ship was driven ashore and wrecked at the mouth of the Ebro. She was on a voyage from Tarragona, Spain to London.
Martha	United Kingdom	The ship was driven ashore and damaged at Falmouth, Cornwall.
Mary	United Kingdom	The ship was abandoned off the Copeland Islands, County Down. She was on a voyage from Ballyshannon to Runcorn, Cheshire.

== 23 February ==
List of shipwrecks: 23 February 1845
Ship	State	Description
Ann	(United Kingdom of Great Britain and Ireland) British North America	The ship ran aground, capsized and was damaged at Bangor, Caernarfonshire. She was on a voyage from Liverpool, Lancashire to New York, United States. She was righted on 1 March.
Pomerania	Prussia	The ship ran aground off "Grenau" and was abandoned by her crew. She was on a voyage from Grangemouth, Stirlingshire, United Kingdom to Wolgast.

== 25 February ==
List of shipwrecks: 25 February 1845
Ship	State	Description
Sylphiden	Flag unknown	The ship was wrecked in ice off Kolberg and sank.

== 26 February ==
List of shipwrecks: 26 February 1845
Ship	State	Description
Johanna Bruhn	Flag unknown	The ship was sunk by ice off Kolberg.
John	United Kingdom	The ship ran aground on Hamilton's Bank, in the Solent. She was refloated the next day and taken in to Portsmouth, Hampshire.

== 27 February ==
List of shipwrecks: 27 February 1845
Ship	State	Description
Ann	(United Kingdom of Great Britain and Ireland) British North America	The ship capsized off Bangor, Caernarfonshire. She was righted on 1 March.
Colibri	France	The brig foundered off Île Bourbon with the loss of all but seven of her crew.
Gustaf	Sweden	The barque was driven ashore near Chester, Pennsylvania, United States. She was on a voyage from Cardiff, Glamorgan, United Kingdom to Philadelphia, Pennsylvania.
Halifax Packet	United Kingdom	The ship was driven ashore at Fremantle, Swan River Colony. She was on a voyage from the Swan River to London.
Mary	United Kingdom	The ship foundered in the Irish Sea 17 nautical miles (31 km) south east of the North and South Rock Lighthouse. Her crew were rescued by Dispatch (United Kingdom).
Neptune	United Kingdom	The ship ran aground on a reef off "Bongrata Island", caught fire and sank. Her crew were rescued. She was on a voyage from Bombay, India to China.

== 28 February ==
List of shipwrecks: 28 February 1845
Ship	State	Description
Apollo	United Kingdom	The ship was wrecked on the Nore. Her crew were rescued. She was on a voyage from Dartmouth, Devon to London.
Brothers	United Kingdom	The ship foundered 5 nautical miles (9.3 km) north east of Ilfracombe, Devon. Her crew were rescued. She was on a voyage from Truro, Cornwall to Port Talbot, Glamorgan.
Chieftain	United Kingdom	The ship ran aground on the north east point of Madura Island, Netherlands East Indies.
Emerald	United Kingdom	The schooner ran aground on the Middle Sand, in the North Sea off the coast of Essex. She was refloated and put in to the River Thames.
Fortuna	United Kingdom	The ship was wrecked on the Elbow End Bank, off the mouth of the River Spey. Her crew were rescued.
Halifax Packet	(United Kingdom of Great Britain and Ireland) British North America	The ship was wrecked on the Success Bank, off Leschenault, Swan River Colony.
Lusitania	United Kingdom	The schooner ran aground off Dundee, Forfarshire. She was on a voyage from Ichaboe Island, Portuguese West Africa to Dundee. She was refloated on 4 March with assistance from the steamship Modern Athens (United Kingdom).
Marne	France	The ship was driven ashore near "La Nouvelle", Pyrénées-Orientales. She was on a voyage from Puerto Rio to Marseille, Bouches-du-Rhône. She was refloated and taken in to Port-Vendres.
Merope	United Kingdom	The barque was wrecked on the Parmelia Bank, off Leschenault.

== Unknown date ==
List of shipwrecks: unknown date in February 1845
Ship	State	Description
HMS Alecto	Royal Navy	The Alecto-class sloop ran aground in the Bay of Naples before 8 February. She was on a voyage from Naples, Kingdom of the Two Sicilies to Toulon, Var, France. She was refloated and resumed her voyage.
Ann	United Kingdom	The ship was wrecked near Whitby, Yorkshire between 3 and 9 February.
Averick	United States	The whaler was wrecked at Papeete, Tahiti. Her crew survived.
Calcutta	France	The ship was wrecked at Tobasco in early February. Her crew were rescued. She was on a voyage from Tobasco to Marseille, Bouches-du-Rhône.
Chelsea	United States	The whaler was wrecked in the Chatham Islands, New Zealand. Her eighteen crew were rescued.
Countess of Eglington	United Kingdom	The ship was driven ashore on Neuwerk. She was later refloated and taken in to Cuxhaven, where she arrived on 16 February.
Cyrus	United Kingdom	The ship was wrecked on Cayo Verde, Cuba before 15 February. Her crew were rescued. She was on a voyage from Liverpool, Lancashire to Havana, Cuba.
Donald	United Kingdom	The brig was lost at Carmen before 7 February.
Duncan	United Kingdom	The ship was wrecked on Cape Sable Island, Nova Scotia, British North America before 15 February. Her crew were rescued. She was on a voyage from the Clyde to Savannah, Georgia, United States.
Elizabeth	(United Kingdom of Great Britain and Ireland) New Zealand	The schooner was wrecked in Portland Bay, New Zealand during a gale in early February. The same gale wrecked the Sally Ann (qv).
Flora	Hamburg	The brig was abandoned in the North Sea off Orfordness, Suffolk, United Kingdom before 8 February. She was on a voyage from Cardiff, Glamorgan, United Kingdom to Hamburg. She was taken in to Harwich, Essex, United Kingdom.
Helen	Netherlands	The ship departed from London, United Kingdom for Amsterdam, North Holland. No further trace, presumed foundered with the loss of all hands.
Jane	United Kingdom	The sloop foundered in the North Sea off Saltfleet, Lincolnshire between 3 and 9 February.
Jane Eliza	(United Kingdom of Great Britain and Ireland) New South Wales	The ship was wrecked in a typhoon before 1 March. She put in to Tongatapu, where she was condemned.
Jeune Henri	France	The ship was wrecked at Tobasco in early February. Her crew were rescued.
Lady Scott	United Kingdom	The schooner was wrecked on the Castle Sands between 3 and 9 February.
Lord Glenelg	United Kingdom	The ship was driven ashore and wrecked at Whitchett Point, County Durham.
Mary	(United Kingdom of Great Britain and Ireland) Isle of Man	The ship sank off Ramsey. She was refloated on 19 July and taken in to Ramsey.
Napier	United Kingdom	The ship was wrecked on the coast of Spain between 3 and 9 February.
Nelson	United Kingdom	The ship was wrecked whilst on a voyage from Limerick to Dumfries with the loss of all four of her crew.
Sally Ann	(United Kingdom of Great Britain and Ireland) New Zealand	The schooner was wrecked in Portland Bay, New Zealand during a gale in early February. The same gale wrecked the Elizabeth (qv).
Tory	United Kingdom	The ship was wrecked at the mouth of the Yangtze before 26 February. She was on a voyage from Singapore to Shanghai, China.
