= List of shipwrecks in January 1845 =

The list of shipwrecks in January 1845 includes ships sunk, wrecked, grounded, or otherwise lost during January 1845.

== 1 January ==
List of shipwrecks: 1 January 1845
Ship	State	Description
Ceres	United Kingdom	The ship was wrecked on the Haisborough Sands, in the North Sea off the coast of Norfolk. Her crew were rescued by the smack Orbit (United Kingdom). Ceres was on a voyage from North Shields, County Durham to London.
Gipsey Queen	United Kingdom	The ship was driven ashore and wrecked on Spurn Point, Yorkshire. Her crew were rescued.

== 2 January ==
List of shipwrecks: 2 January 1845
Ship	State	Description
Alpha	(United Kingdom of Great Britain and Ireland) British North America	The ship was driven ashore near Big Pond, Nova Scotia. Her crew were rescued.
Blyth	United Kingdom	The sloop was driven ashore and wrecked 3 nautical miles (5.6 km) north of Whitby, Yorkshire. Her crew were rescued. She was on a voyage from Whitby to Stockton on Tees, County Durham.
Exchange	United Kingdom	The ship ran aground on the West Hoyle Bank, in Liverpool Bay. She was on a voyage from Messina, Sicily to Liverpool, Lancashire.
Kuningunde	Hamburg	The ship was sunk by ice at Cuxhaven. She was on a voyage from Aberdour, Fife, United Kingdom to Hamburg.

== 3 January ==
List of shipwrecks: 3 January 1845
Ship	State	Description
Amicitia	United Kingdom	The pilot cutter was driven ashore and wrecked at Walberswick, Suffolk before 23 January.
Governor Harcourt	United Kingdom	The barque ran aground on the Barnard Sand, in the North Sea off the coast of Suffolk. She was on a voyage from British Honduras to Sunderland, County Durham. Governor Harcourt was refloated and towed in to Harwich, Essex in a leaky condition.
Esperance	United Kingdom	The sloop was driven ashore and wrecked west of St. Monans, Fife. Her three crew survived. She was on a voyage from St Andrews, Fife to Cambus, Clackmannanshire.
Henry Taylor	United Kingdom	The ship ran aground on the Whitby Rock. She was refloated and resumed her voyage.
St. George	United Kingdom	The ship was driven ashore at Maryport, Cumberland. She was on a voyage from Dublin to Maryport.

== 4 January ==
List of shipwrecks: 4 January 1845
Ship	State	Description
Alert	United Kingdom	The ship ran aground on the Hen and Chickens, off Halifax, Nova Scotia, British North America. She was on a voyage from Liverpool, Lancashire to Country Harbour, Nova Scotia. She was refloated the next day.
Johanna Charlotta	Netherlands	The ship was wrecked on the Thistle Rocks, in the Baltic Sea. Her crew were rescued. She was on a voyage from Amsterdam, North Holland to Stettin.
Mary	United Kingdom	The brigantine was driven ashore and severely damaged at Breaksea Point, Glamorgan. She was on a voyage from Newry, County Antrim to Bristol, Gloucestershire.
Minerva	United Kingdom	The ship was driven ashore at Mundesley, Norfolk. She was on a voyage from Montrose, Forfarshire to London. She was refloated of 6 January and taken in to Great Yarmouth in a leaky condition.
Pembroke	United Kingdom	The sloop was wrecked in the Demerara River.
Thetis	United Kingdom	The ship ran aground on the Middle Ground, off the coast of county Durham. She was on a voyage from Vardiff, Glamorgan to North Shields, County Durham.

== 5 January ==
List of shipwrecks: 5 January 1845
Ship	State	Description
Agnes	United Kingdom	The brig struck a reef of the South Rock Lighthouse, County Antrim and was wrecked. Her crew were rescued. She was on a voyage from Ichaboe Island, Portuguese West Africa to Glasgow, Renfrewshire.
Argo	United States	The ship ran aground at Havre de Grâce, Seine-Inférieure, France.
Dove	United Kingdom	The ship collided with the schooner Albion (United Kingdom) and foundered in the North Sea off the coast of Yorkshire. Her captain was rescued by a trawl boat, the rest of her crew were rescued by Albion. Dove was on a voyage from Sunderland, County Durham to Jersey, Channel Islands.
Fleetwood	United Kingdom	The ship was driven ashore near the mouth of the Breede River. Her crew were rescued. She was on a voyage from the Breede River to an English port.
Francis Depeau	France	The ship ran aground at Havre de Grâce.
Kingston	United Kingdom	The ship ran aground in the River Mersey. She was on a voyage from Ichaboe Island, Portuguese West Africa to Liverpool, Lancashire. She was refloated the next day.
Mary Ann Mitchell	United Kingdom	The ship was driven ashore and wrecked at Plymouth, Devon.
St. Pol	Norway	The ship struck a sunken rock and foundered off "Koster's Lostsplatz". Her crew were rescued. She was on a voyage from "Weile" to Moss.

== 6 January ==
List of shipwrecks: 6 January 1845
Ship	State	Description
Gales	United Kingdom	The ship departed from Middlesbrough, Yorkshire for London. No further trace, presumed foundered in the North Sea with the loss of all hands.
George Thompson	(United Kingdom of Great Britain and Ireland) British North America	The ship ran aground on the Duck Island Ledge and capsized with the loss of a crew member. She was on a voyage from Boston, Massachusetts, United States to Digby, Nova Scotia.
Joshua Emlyn	United States	The barque was driven ashore and wrecked at Gibraltar. She was on a voyage from Palermo, Sicily to an American port.
P. H. Dean	United Kingdom	The ship was driven ashore between Gibraltar and Algeciras, Spain. She was on a voyage from Smyrna, Ottoman Empire to Dublin. She was refloated and resumed her voyage.
Stafford	United Kingdom	The brig was driven ashore between Blakeney and Wells-next-the-Sea, Norfolk. She was on a voyage from Sunderland, County Durham to London. She was refloated and resumed her voyage.

== 7 January ==
List of shipwrecks: 7 January 1845
Ship	State	Description
Ann	United Kingdom	The barque, on her maiden voyage, was wrecked on the Haisborough Sands, in the North Sea off the coast of Norfolk. Her crew were rescued by the paddle steamer Waterwitch (United Kingdom). Ann was on a voyage from Ichaboe Island, Portuguese West Africa to Sunderland, County Durham.
Eamont	United Kingdom	The ship ran aground and was consequently beached in the Orkney Islands. She was on a voyage from South Shields, County Durham to Constantinople, Ottoman Empire. She was refloated on 24 January and taken in to Stromness.
George Marchant, or George Thompson	(United Kingdom of Great Britain and Ireland) British North America	The ship was wrecked on York's Ledge, off the Isle au Haut. Maine, United States with the loss of two lives. She was on a voyage from Boston, Massachusetts, United States to Digby, Nova Scotia.
Lady Mary	United Kingdom	The schooner was run down and sunk by the steamship Glowworm (United Kingdom) off the entrance to the Belfast Lough, Her crew were rescued. She was on a voyage from Belfast, County Antrim to London. Lady Mary was refloated on 26 February and taken in to Belfast.
Speculation	United Kingdom	The ship was driven ashore in a capsized condition near "Stenevar", Norway. She subsequently floated off.
Wave	United Kingdom	The ship ran aground and was damaged on the Burbo Bank, in Liverpool Bay. She was on a voyage from Quebec City, Province of Canada, British North America to Liverpool, Lancashire. She was refloated and completed her voyage.

== 8 January ==
List of shipwrecks: 8 January 1845
Ship	State	Description
Ann and Emma	United Kingdom	The brig ran aground on Scroby Sands, Norfolk. She was on a voyage from Sunderland, County Durham to London. She was refloated on 10 January and taken in to Great Yarmouth.
Brisk	United Kingdom	The ship ran aground on the Long-nose Rock, off the coast of Kent. She was on a voyage from Jamaica to London. She was refloated and resumed her voyage.
Coldstream	United Kingdom	The brig ran aground on Scroby Sands. She was refloated on 10 January and taken in to Great Yarmouth.
Owner's Goodwill	United Kingdom	The ship was wrecked on the Pole Sand, off the coast of Devon.
Peru	United Kingdom	The ship was driven ashore near Stephano Point, Ottoman Empire. She was on a voyage from Galați to London. She was refloated on 12 January and taken in to Constantinople.

== 9 January ==
List of shipwrecks: 9 January 1845
Ship	State	Description
Aguillon	United Kingdom	The ship was driven ashore and wrecked 7 nautical miles (13 km) north of Scarborough, Yorkshire. Her crew were rescued.
Alvoen	Norway	The brig struck rocks and was beached near Bergen. She was on a voyage from St. Ubes, Portugal to Bergen. She was later refloated and taken in to Bergen.
Bird	United Kingdom	The brig ran aground on Scroby Sands, Norfolk. She was refloated on 14 January and resumed her voyage, but in consequence of being leaky put in to Great Yarmouth, Norfolk.
Castillian Maid	United Kingdom	The ship ran aground on the Goodwin Sands, Kent. She was refloated and taken in to Ramsgate, Kent in a leaky condition,
Jean and Ann	United Kingdom	The sloop was driven ashore and wrecked at Wick, Caithness. Her crew were rescued. She was on a voyage from Findhorn, Morayshire to Wick.
John and Mary	United Kingdom	The sloop departed from Leith for Aberlady, Lothian. No further trace, presumed foundered with the loss of all hands.
Laura	France	The ship was wrecked near "St. Geldas". Her crew were rescued. She was on a voyage from Cette, Hérault to Nantes, Loire-Inférieure.

== 10 January ==
List of shipwrecks: 10 January 1845
Ship	State	Description
Design	United Kingdom	The cutter was in collision with a barque and foundered in the English Channel off the coast of Dorset. Her crew were rescued. She was on a voyage from Terceira Island, Azores to London. A claim that the barque Patriot (United Kingdom) was the offending ship was dismissed in the Admiralty Court.
Freedom	United Kingdom	The ship ran aground off Anglesey and was damaged. She was on a voyage from Liverpool, Lancashire to Naples, Kingdom of the Two Sicilies. She was refloated and put in to Holyhead, Anglesey.
Frithioff	(Russian Empire) Grand Duchy of Finland	The ship ran aground on the Goodwin Sands. She was on a voyage from Hull, Yorkshire, United Kingdom to Malta. She was refloated and anchored in The Gulls.
George	France	The ship struck a rock and foundered in the English Channel off Barfleur, Manche. All on board were rescued. She was on a voyage from Valparaíso, Chile to Havre de Grâce, Seine-Inférieure.
Harmony	United Kingdom	The ship was driven ashore in Sandy Haven Bay, Pembrokeshire. SHe was on a voyage from Llanelly, Glamorgan to London. She was refloated on 24 January and taken in to Milford Haven, Pembrokeshire.
Henrietta	United Kingdom	The ship was driven ashore in Sandy Haven Bay. She was on a voyage from Llanelly to London.
Inglis	United Kingdom	The East Indiaman was wrecked on a reef in the Strait of Sunda off Java, Netherlands East Indies. Her 170 crew survived the wreck, but 80 of them subsequently died of fever. She was on a voyage from Bombay, India to Chusan, China.
John Daniel	United Kingdom	The ship was driven ashore in Sandy Haven Bay. She was on a voyage from Swansea, Glamorgan to Youghal, County Cork. She was refloated on 27 January.
Maria	United Kingdom	The ship was wrecked on the Middle Spit Sand, in the Bristol Channel off the coast of Glamorgan. Her crew were rescued. She was on a voyage from Llanelly, Glamorgan to London.
Maria	United Kingdom	The ship ran aground off Helsingør, Denmark. She was on a voyage from Riga, Russia to Hull. She was refloated and resumed her voyage.
Mariner	United Kingdom	The ship was wrecked on the Hooper Sand, in Carmarthen Bay. Her crew were rescued. She was on a voyage from Llanelly to London.
North Esk	United Kingdom	The ship was driven against the quayside and sank at Arbroath, Forfarshire. She was on a voyage from Grangemouth, Stirlingshire to Arbroath.
Palace	United Kingdom	The ship ran aground on the Klein Vogel Sand, in the North Sea. She was on a voyage from Sunderland, County Durham to Hamburg. She was refloated and towed in to Cuxhaven.
Patmos	United Kingdom	The ship ran aground on the Longsand, in the North Sea off the coast of Essex and was damaged. She was on a voyage from Sunderland, County Durham to Newhaven, Sussex. She was refloated and taken in to Harwich, Essex.
Pryde	United Kingdom	The ship ran aground off Helsingør. She was on a voyage from Riga to Londonderry. She was refloated and resumed her voyage.

== 11 January ==
List of shipwrecks: 11 January 1845
Ship	State	Description
Coromando	United Kingdom	The ship was abandoned in the Atlantic Ocean. Her crew were rescued by Brothers (United Kingdom). Coromando was on a voyage from Liverpool, Lancashire to Boston, Massachusetts, United States.
Elizabeth	United Kingdom	The brig was driven ashore and wrecked in Tramona Bay, Ireland with the loss of one of her five crew. She was on a voyage from Newport, Monmouthshire to Cork.
Hebe	United Kingdom	The ship was wrecked at Porto, Portugal. Her crew were rescued. She was on a voyage from Cardiff, Glamorgan to Porto.
Ludwig	Hamburg	The ship was abandoned in ice off Kertch, Russia. She was subsequently taken in to Feodosia.
Mary	United Kingdom	The ship was driven ashore at "Mutlich", Pembrokeshire. She was on a voyage from Newport to Cork.
Sigismund Cæsar	Bremen	The ship was holed by ice and driven ashore near Weddewarden. She was on a voyage from Rio de Janeiro, Brazil to Bremen.
William	United Kingdom	The ship ran aground on the West Rocks, in the North Sea off the coast of Essex. She was refloated and put in to Harwich, Essex.
William Turner	United Kingdom	The ship was wrecked in Carnarvon Bay with the loss of all 30 crew. She was on a voyage from Ichaboe Island, Portuguese West Africa to Liverpool, Lancashire.

== 12 January ==
List of shipwrecks: 12 January 1845
Ship	State	Description
Camilla	United Kingdom	The ship was driven ashore at Stege, Denmark. She was on a voyage from Riga, Russia to Belfast, County Antrim. She was refloated the next day and put in to Copenhagen, Denmark.
Ovid	United Kingdom	The ship was driven ashore north of Bridlington, Yorkshire. She was refloated on 21 January.

== 13 January ==
List of shipwrecks: 13 January 1845
Ship	State	Description
Esperanza	(United Kingdom of Great Britain and Ireland) British North America	The ship was wrecked in the Tusket Islands, Nova Scotia. Her crew were rescued. She was on a voyage from St. Stephen, New Brunswick to Trinidad.
Lucy Ann	United Kingdom	The ship was wrecked near the Charles Fort, County Cork. She was on a voyage from Ichaboe Island, Portuguese West Africa to Cork.
HMS Pelican	Royal Navy	The Cruizer-class brig-sloop ran aground on the Peel Bank, in the English Channel off the coast of Hampshire. She was on a voyage from Hong Kong to Portsmouth, Hampshire. She was refloated the next day and taken in to Portsmouth.
Princess Alice	United Kingdom	The ship was in collision with Voyager (United Kingdom) off Southwold, Suffolk and was abandoned by her crew, who were rescued by Voyager. Princess Alice was on a voyage from Newcastle upon Tyne to London. She came ashore at Walberswick, Suffolk the next day. Subsequently taken in to Southwold, repaired and returned to service.

== 14 January ==
List of shipwrecks: 14 January 1845
Ship	State	Description
Idris	United Kingdom	The brig was abandoned in the Atlantic Ocean. Her thirteen crew were rescued by the barque Robert Watson (United Kingdom). Idris was on a voyage from Ichaboe Island, Portuguese West Africa to Falmouth, Cornwall.
Maria Wooden	United Kingdom	The schooner was driven ashore near Cape Cod, Massachusetts, United States. She was on a voyage from Halifax, Nova Scotia, British North America to Boston, Massachusetts.
Sarah Bell	United Kingdom	The ship ran aground on the Haisborough Sands, in the North Sea off the coast of Norfolk and was abandoned by her crew. She was on a voyage from Shoreham-by-Sea, Sussex to Seaham, County Durham. She was later refloated and taken to Cley-next-the-Sea, Norfolk by some fishing boats.
St. Dominique	France	The ship was driven ashore at Hyères, Var.
Thérèse François	France	The ship was driven ashore at Hyères.

== 15 January ==
List of shipwrecks: 15 January 1845
Ship	State	Description
Belleisle	United Kingdom	The ship was wrecked at Kearney Point, County Down. She was on a voyage from Maryport, Cumberland to Dublin.
Churchill	United Kingdom	The ship was driven ashore at Hayle, Cornwall. She was refloated.
Circassian	United Kingdom	The ship ran aground at Castletown, Isle of Man.
Edward Robinson	United Kingdom	The East Indiaman ran aground and was wrecked off Sheerness, Kent. She was on a voyage from Whampoa, China to London. She was refloated and beached at Sheerness.
William Kelson	United Kingdom	The brig ran aground off the South Rock Lighthouse, County Antrim and was damaged. She was on a voyage from Alicante, Spain to Belfast, County Antrim. She was refloated and taken in to Ballyhulbert Bay, then Belfast.

== 16 January ==
List of shipwrecks: 16 January 1845
Ship	State	Description
Devonshire	United Kingdom	The steamship ran aground on the West Hoyle Bank, in Liverpool Bay. She was on a voyage from Newry, County Antrim to Liverpool, Lancashire. She was refloated on 19 January and taken in to Liverpool.
Friendship	United Kingdom	The ship struck a sunken rock and sank in the Sound of Mull. She was on a voyage from Dublin to Newcastle upon Tyne, Northumberland.
Inglis	United Kingdom	The ship was driven ashore at Anger Point, Africa.
Jenny Jones	United Kingdom	The ship was driven ashore at Cape Palomi, Greece. She was on a voyage from Liverpool, Lancashire to Syros, Greece. She was refloated on 20 January and taken in to Salonica, Greece.
Jessamine	United Kingdom	The ship was driven ashore at Bridlington, Yorkshire. She was on a voyage from Shoreham-by-Sea, Sussex to Hartlepool, County Durham. She was refloated and resumed her voyage.
Pollock	United Kingdom	The ship was wrecked on Chandelier Island, Louisiana, United States. Her crew survived. She was on a voyage from Liverpool to New Orleans, Louisiana. She was later refloated and taken in to New Orleans

== 17 January ==
List of shipwrecks: 17 January 1845
Ship	State	Description
Annabella	United Kingdom	The ship sprang a leak whilst on a voyage from Livorno, Tuscany to Liverpool, Lancashire. She put in to Vigo, Spain in a sinking condition.
Blucher	United Kingdom	The ship was in collision with Marvel (United Kingdom) and sank. Her crew were rescued. She was on a voyage from Gloucester to Cardiff, Glamorgan.
Favourite	United Kingdom	The ship was driven ashore at Bideford, Devon. She was on a voyage from Saundersfoot, Pembrokeshire to Bideford.
Frolic	United Kingdom	The schooner was driven ashore and wrecked near Newcastle, County Down. Her crew were rescued. She was on a voyage from Liverpool, Lancashire to Dordrecht, South Holland, Netherlands.
Hope	United Kingdom	The ship ran aground on the Saltscar Rocks, County Durham. She was refloated and taken in to the River Tees.
Hadgill	United Kingdom	The ship ran aground on the Ridge Sand, in the North Sea off the coast of Suffolk. She was on a voyage from South Shields, County Durham to London. She was refloated and resumed her voyage.
Northumbria	United Kingdom	The brig sprang a leak and was beached on the Crow Sand, off the Isles of Scilly. Her crew survived. She was on a voyage from Cardiff to London.
Sarah Scott	(United Kingdom of Great Britain and Ireland) New South Wales	The barque was driven ashore in Corner Inlet. Her crew survived. She was on a voyage from Sydney to Port Phillip, South Australia.
Tweedside	United Kingdom	The paddle tug was in collision with Concordia (United Kingdom) and sank 7 nautical miles (13 km) off Sunderland, County Durham. Her crew were rescued.

== 18 January ==
List of shipwrecks: 18 January 1845
Ship	State	Description
Commerce	(United Kingdom of Great Britain and Ireland) British North America	The ship was wrecked at Shag Harbour, Nova Scotia. Her crew were rescued. She was on a voyage from Yarmouth, Nova Scotia to Grenada.
Freundschaft	Grand Duchy of Oldenburg	The ship was severely damaged by ice at Elsfleth.
John and Mary	United Kingdom	The ship was driven ashore at Saltfleet, Lincolnshire. She was on a voyage from Dunkirk, Nord to Hull, Yorkshire. She was refloated.
Mercur	Grand Duchy of Oldenburg	The ship was severely damaged by ice at Elsfleth.
Othello	Denmark	The ship ran aground of Skagen. She was refloated and resumed her voyage.
Vine	United Kingdom	The sloop sprang a leak in the North Sea whilst on a voyage from Glasgow, Renfrewshire to Newcastle upon Tyne, Northumberland. She put in to Blyth, Northumberland where she ran aground.

== 19 January ==
List of shipwrecks: January 1845
Ship	State	Description
Cambria	United Kingdom	The ship foundered off the Gore Sands, in the Bristol Channel with the loss of a crew member. She was on a voyage from Lydney, Gloucestershire to Burnham-on-Sea, Somerset.
Diamond	United Kingdom	The schooner was driven ashore and wrecked on the south coast of the Isle of Arran. Her crew were rescued. She was on a voyage from Cádiz, Spain to Glasgow, Renfrewshire.
Jane and Mary	United Kingdom	The ship ran aground on the Hale, in the North Sea off the coast of Lincolnshire. She was on a voyage from Dunkirk, Nord, France to Hull, Yorkshire. She was refloated the next day and completed her voyage.
Rosebud	United Kingdom	The ship ran aground on the Goodwin Sands, Kent. Her crew were rescued. She was on a voyage from Belfast, County Antrim to London. Rosebud was refloated and taken in to Ramsgate, Kent.
Willem Cornelis	Netherlands	The galiot was driven ashore at St Anthony's Lighthouse, Cornwall, United Kingdom. She was on a voyage from Licata, Sicily to Rotterdam, South Holland. She was refloated the next day. Willem Cornelis was later refloated and taken in to Falmouth, Cornwall.

== 20 January ==
List of shipwrecks: 20 January 1845
Ship	State	Description
Eclipse	(United Kingdom of Great Britain and Ireland) British North America	The ship was wrecked off the east coast of Battery Island. Her crew were rescued. She was on a voyage from Saint John's, Newfoundland to Arichat, Nova Scotia.
John	(United Kingdom of Great Britain and Ireland) Jersey	The ship was driven ashore at Great Yarmouth, Norfolk with the loss of a crew member. She was on a voyage from South Shields, County Durham to Jersey.
Lady Ann	United Kingdom	The ship put in to St. Ives, Cornwall, where she sank. She was on a voyage from Newport, Monmouthshire to King's Lynn, Norfolk.
Le Jeune Edouard	France	The chasse-marée was wrecked near Calais with the loss of all hands. She was on a voyage from Dunkirk, Nord to Abbeville, Somme.
Paulina	United Kingdom	The ship ran aground at North Shields, County Durham. She was on a voyage from Sunderland, County Durham to Newcastle upon Tyne, Northumberland. She was refloated.
William Pitt	United Kingdom	The brig was wrecked on the Doom Bar with the loss of all but one of her eleven crew. She was on a voyage from Alexandria, Egypt to Gloucester.

== 21 January ==
List of shipwrecks: 21 January 1845
Ship	State	Description
Gazelle	United Kingdom	The ship was driven ashore at Lunenburg, Nova Scotia, British North America. She was on a voyage from Berbice, British Honduras to Halifax, Nova Scotia. She was later refloated.
Hudgill	United Kingdom	The ship ran aground on the Gunfleet Sand, in the North Sea off the coast of Essex. She was on a voyage from South Shields, County Durham to London. She was refloated and resumed her voyage.
Midas	United Kingdom	The ship struck a sunken rock at Lochboisdale, South Uist, Outer Hebrides and was beached. She was on a voyage from Saint John, New Brunswick, British North America to Galway.
Raker	United Kingdom	The ship was driven ashore at Ravenglass, Cumberland. She was on a voyage from Chester, Cheshire to Ravengalss. She was refloated on 23 January and taken in to Ravenglass.

== 23 January ==
List of shipwrecks: 23 January 1845
Ship	State	Description
Clarinda	United Kingdom	The barque was driven ashore and wrecked on Barra, Outer Hebrides. She was on a voyage from Quebec City, Province of Canada, British North America to New Ross, County Wexford.

== 24 January ==
List of shipwrecks: 24 January 1845
Ship	State	Description
Eliza	United Kingdom	The ship was driven ashore in McAlister Bay, in the Sound of Mull. She was on a voyage from Liverpool, Lancashire to Kirkwall, Orkney Islands.
Eugene	France	The ship was driven ashore in Pegwell Bay. She was on a voyage from Ostend, West Flanders, Belgium to Havre de Grâce, Seine-Inférieure. She was refloated and taken in to Ramsgate, Kent, United Kingdom.
Exmouth	United Kingdom	The ship struck rocks off Ouessant, Finistère, France and was damaged. She was on a voyage from the Charente to London. She put in to Brest, Finistère.
Norval	United Kingdom	The ship ran aground on the Brake Sand. She was on a voyage from Newcastle upon Tyne, Northumberland to Havre de Grâce, Seine-Inférieure, France. She was refloated and taken in to The Downs.
Robert Burns	United Kingdom	The brig was abandoned in the Irish Sea with the loss of her captain. Ten people were rescued by Perseverance (United Kingdom). Robert Burns was later towed in to Greenock, Renfrewshire by Isabella Napier (United Kingdom.
Rosseau	United Kingdom	The ship ran aground in the River Tyne at Wallsend, Northumberland. She was refloated and beached at North Shields, County Durham.
Sarah Scott	United Kingdom	The barque was driven ashore in Corner Inlet. She was on a voyage from Sydney, New South Wales to Port Phillip, South Australia.

== 25 January ==
List of shipwrecks: 25 January 1845
Ship	State	Description
Christina	United Kingdom	The ship was abandoned in the Irish Sea off Cushendall, County Down. Her crew were rescued. She was on a voyage from the Clyde to Belfast, County Antrim.
Gough	United Kingdom	The ship was wrecked at Cley-next-the-Sea, Norfolk. She was on a voyage from Newcastle upon Tyne, Northumberland to Cley-next-the-Sea.
James	United Kingdom	The ship ran aground at South Shields, County Durham. She was refloated on 28 January and taken in to South Shields.
John Alexander	United Kingdom	The ship was driven ashore at Great Yarmouth, Norfolk. She was on a voyage from Sunderland, County Durham to Abbeville, Somme, France. She was refloated and taken in to Great Yarmouth.
Margaret	United Kingdom	The ship was driven ashore and wrecked in Widemouth Bay. Her crew were rescued. She was on a voyage from Cork to Porthcawl, Glamorgan.
Margaret Hardy	United Kingdom	The barque ran aground and was wrecked at Port Talbot, Glamorgan. She was on a voyage from Port Talbot to Calcutta, India. She was refloated on 13 March and towed to Swansea, Glamorgan.
Nancy	United Kingdom	The ship was driven ashore at Workington, Cumberland.
New Eagle	United Kingdom	The ship was abandoned in the North Sea. She was on a voyage from South Shields to London. She was subsequently taken in to Bridlington, Yorkshire.

== 26 January ==
List of shipwrecks: January 1845
Ship	State	Description
Aid	United Kingdom	The ship was driven ashore at Berck-sur-Mer, Pas-de-Calais, France. Her crew were rescued. She was on a voyage from Sunderland, County Durham to Étaples, Pas-de-Calais.
Amonaka	United Kingdom	The ship was driven ashore at Grimsby, Lincolnshire. She was on a voyage from Goole, Yorkshire to Wisbech, Cambridgeshire. She was refloated on 11 February.
Ann or Ann Porter	United Kingdom	The collier, a brig, was wrecked on Scroby Sands, Norfolk. Seven crew of the yawl Phoenix (United Kingdom) were lost going to her aid. Her nine crew were rescued by the Caister Lifeboat. She was on a voyage from Sunderland to London.
Ann	United Kingdom	The ship was abandoned in the North Sea. Her crew were rescued. She was on a voyage from South Shields, County Durham to Great Yarmouth, Norfolk.
Brothock	United Kingdom	The ship was wrecked on Scroby Sands with the loss of all hands.
Choice	United Kingdom	The brig was abandoned in the North Sea off the coast of Norfolk. Her nine crew were rescued by the yawl Sailor's Friend (United Kingdom).
Commerce	United Kingdom	The Humber Keel was driven ashore and wrecked at Cleethorpes, Lincolnshire. Her crew were rescued.
Commerce	United Kingdom	The ship was driven ashore and wrecked at the entrance to Larne Lough. She was on a voyage from the Clyde to Londonderry.
Cuba	Hamburg	The ship capsized at Cuxhaven. She was on a voyage from Havana, Cuba to Hamburg.
David	United Kingdom	The ship was driven ashore near Stranraer, Wigtownshire. Her crew were rescued. She was on a voyage from South Shields, County Durham to Cartagena, Spain.
Dundee	United Kingdom	The schooner was driven ashore in a gale and wrecked at Kirk Michael, Isle of Man. Her crew were rescued. She was on a voyage from Dundee, Forfarshire to Liverpool, Lancashire.
Eleanor	United Kingdom	The ship ran aground at Sligo. She was on a voyage from Saint John, New Brunswick, British North America to Sligo.
Eliza	United Kingdom	The ship foundered in the River Mersey off Birkenhead, Cheshire. She was on a voyage from Killough, County Louth to Liverpool, Lancashire.
Elizabeth	United Kingdom	The ship ran aground on the Cross Sand, in the North Sea off the coast of Norfolk. She floated off but consequently foundered. Her nine crew were rescued by the yawl Storm (United Kingdom). Elizabeth was on a voyage from Middlesbrough, Yorkshire to London.
Ellen Stewart	United Kingdom	The schooner was driven ashore at Girvan, Ayrshire. All on board were rescued. She was on a voyage from Waterford to Glasgow, Renfrewshire.
Fortfield	United Kingdom	The ship ran aground, capsized and sank in the Victoria Channel with the loss of a crew member. She was on a voyage from Ichaboe Island, Portuguese West Africa to Liverpool.
Gales	United Kingdom	The ship departed from Middlesbrough, Yorkshire for London. No further trace, presumed foundered with the loss of all hands.
Gennessee	United Kingdom	The ship was driven ashore on Grand Bahama. She was on a voyage from New Orleans, Louisiana, United States to Liverpool. She was refloated on 28 January and taken in to Nassau, Bahamas.
Harmony	(United Kingdom of Great Britain and Ireland) Isle of Man	The ship ran aground off Glashedy, County Donegal. She was then driven ashore and wrecked at Ennishowen with the loss of all hands.
Harriet	United Kingdom	The ship was driven ashore at Spurn Point, Yorkshire. Her crew were rescued. She was refloated on 8 February.
Helen Stewart	United Kingdom	The schooner was driven ashore and severely damaged at Girvan Head, Ayrshire. She was on a voyage from Waterford to the Clyde. She was refloated on 29 January and taken in to Ayr.
Isabella	United Kingdom	The ship was driven ashore near Stranraer.
James	United Kingdom	The ship capsized at Sligo. She was righted the next day.
Jane	United Kingdom	The brig was wrecked on Scroby Sands. Her nine crew were rescued by the yawl Red Rover (United Kingdom). Jane was on a voyage from Middlesbrough to London.
Jessie Cook	United Kingdom	The smack was driven ashore in the Clyde at Gammill's Point. She was refloated.
Lion	United Kingdom	The ship was driven ashore at Spurn Point. She was on a voyage from Glasgow, Renfrewshire to Bordeaux, Gironde, France. She was refloated on 12 February and taken in to Hull, Yorkshire.
Manchester	United Kingdom	The barque was wrecked on the West Hoyle, in Liverpool Bay. Her thirteen crew were rescued by the Hoylake Lifeboat. She was on a voyage from Liverpool to Calcutta, India.
Mary Key	United Kingdom	The ship was driven ashore at Spurn Point. Her crew were rescued. She was refloated on 9 February and taken in to Hull.
Pedler	United Kingdom	The ship was wrecked on the Inner Barber Sand, in the North Sea off the coast of Norfolk. Her crew were rescued. She was on a voyage from Middlesbrough to Dover, Kent.
Phoenix	United Kingdom	The yawl was wrecked whilst going to the assistance of the collier brig Ann with the loss of seven of the fifteen people on board. Survivors were rescued by the Caister Lifeboat.
Sarah	United Kingdom	The ship was driven ashore in Ballyholme Bay. Her crew were rescued. She was on a voyage from Dénia, Spain to Dublin.
Shannon	United Kingdom	The schooner was wrecked at Rathlin Island, County Antrim with the loss of three of her crew. She was on a voyage from Sligo to London.
Squirrel	United Kingdom	The ship was driven ashore on Spurn Point.
Thistle	United Kingdom	The barque was driven ashore and wrecked in Loch Indaal. She was on a voyage from Glasgow to Demerara, British Guiana.
Valparaiso	United Kingdom	The ship was driven ashore on Crosby Point, Lancashire. She was on a voyage from Liverpool to Valparaíso, Chile.
Vibilia	United Kingdom	The ship was driven ashore and severely damaged in Duart Bay. She was on a voyage from Ichaboe Island to Leith, Lothian.
William	United Kingdom	The ship was driven ashore and wrecked 4 nautical miles (7.4 km) north of Ravenglass, Cumberland. She was on a voyage from Harrington, Cumberland to Liverpool.
William Hinch	United Kingdom	The ship was driven ashore in Bootle Bay. She was on a voyage from Galway to Liverpool.

== 27 January ==
List of shipwrecks: 27 January 1845
Ship	State	Description
Anax	France	The ship was driven ashore at Carmen.
Bilboa	United Kingdom	The ship ran aground and was damaged on the Newcombe Sand, in the North Sea off the coast of Suffolk. She was refloated.
Eraza	(United Kingdom of Great Britain and Ireland) British North America	The ship was wrecked at Lobster Harbour, Newfoundland.
Friends	United Kingdom	The ship ran aground and was damaged on the Newcombe Sand. She was refloated.
Junge Johan	Hamburg	The ship was sunk by ice off the Krantsand, in the North Sea. She was on a voyage from Hartlepool, County Durham, United Kingdom to Altona.
Maria	Belgium	The ship was in collision with another vessel and was beached at Tetney, Lincolnshire, United Kingdom. She was on a voyage from Hull, Yorkshire, United Kingdom to Antwerp. She was refloated and taken in to Grimsby, Lincolnshire.
Northumbrian Maid	United Kingdom	The ship ran aground and was damaged at Spalding, Lincolnshire.
Swansea Trader	United Kingdom	The ship was driven ashore at Spurn Point, Yorkshire and collided with Lion (United Kingdom).
Young Eagle	United Kingdom	The ship was driven ashore at Bridlington, Yorkshire. She was refloated the next day and taken in to Bridlington.

== 28 January ==
List of shipwrecks: 28 January 1845
Ship	State	Description
Betsey	United Kingdom	The ship was driven ashore at Blyth, Northumberland. She was on a voyage from Havre de Grâce, Seine-Inférieure, France to Blyth.
Breakwater	United Kingdom	The ship was driven ashore in the River Nene at King's Lynn, Norfolk. She was refloated on 11 February.
Cora	United Kingdom	The ship was wrecked at Hornsea, Yorkshire. Her crew were rescued. She was on a voyage from South Shields, County Durham to London.
Delphin	Belgium	The ship was driven ashore neat Bath, Zeeland, Netherlands. She was on a voyage from Antwerp to Constantinople, Ottoman Empire. She was refloated and put in to Vlissingen, Zeeland.
Eliza Swan	United Kingdom	The barque was wrecked at the mouth of the Gironde with the loss of all hands. She was on a voyage from Newcastle upon Tyne, Northumberland to Bordeaux, Gironde, France.
Emerald	United Kingdom	The ship ran aground on Diamont Point, Spain. She was on a voyage from Cádiz, Spain to London.
Hazlewood; Mary	United Kingdom (United Kingdom of Great Britain and Ireland) Isle of Man	The ships collided off Ramsey, Isle of Man and Mary sank. Her crew were rescued by Hazlewood, which was then driven ashore and wrecked at Port-e-Vullin, Isle of Man with the loss of both captains. Hazlewood was on a voyage from Sligo to Liverpool; Mary was on a voyage from a Welsh port to the Belfast Lough.
Halifax Packet	United Kingdom	The ship was driven ashore and wrecked in the Swan River.
Industrie	Prussia	The ship was driven ashore and wrecked on Skagen, Denmark. Her crew were rescued. She was on a voyage from Memel to London.
Kitty	United Kingdom	The ship struck a sunken wreck in the North Sea off the Cockle Sand and was holed. She put in to Great Yarmouth, Norfolk. She was on a voyage from Whitby, Yorkshire to London.
Merope	United Kingdom	The whaler was wrecked in the Swan River.
Nyverdahl	Netherlands	The ship was driven ashore at Huisduinen, North Holland. She was on a voyage from Hull, Yorkshire to Zwolle, Overijssel. She was refloated on 17 February and taken in to the Nieuwdiep.
Sancho Panza	United Kingdom	The ship struck a sunken rock between Brixham and Dartmouth, Devon and consequently put in to Brixham. She was on a voyage from Exeter, Devon to St. Ives, Cornwall.
Senhora da Punha	Portugal	The ship struck rocks and sank at Porto with the loss of a crew member. She was on a voyage from Aveiro to Porto.
Tryall	United Kingdom	The sloop was wrecked at Port-e-Vullin. Her crew were rescued. She was on a voyage from Ramsey, Isle of Man to Liverpool.
Wilhelmina	United Kingdom	The schooner foundered in the Irish Sea 6 nautical miles (11 km) north of the Calf of Man, Isle of Man with the loss of all nine people on board. She was on a voyage from Greenock, Renfrewshire to Livorno, Grand Duchy of Tuscany.

== 29 January ==
List of shipwrecks: 29 January 1845
Ship	State	Description
Abigail	United Kingdom	The ship was driven ashore at Killybegs, County Donegal. She was on a voyage from Killybegs to Gloucester.
Azores Packet	United Kingdom	The schooner foundered in Cardigan Bay with the loss of all hands. She was on a voyage from Cork to Liverpool, Lancashire.
Bowne Marie	France)	The ship was driven ashore at the Marzocco Tower, Livorno, Grand Duchy of Tuscany. She was on a voyage from Alexandria, Egypt Eyalet to Marseille, Bouches-du-Rhône.
Brooklyn	United States	The ship driven onto the Piana Bank off Livorno and was damaged. She was refloated and taken into Livorno for repairs.
Commercial Packet	United Kingdom	The ship was driven ashore at Poolewe, Ross-shire.
Corsante	Grand Duchy of Tuscany	The brig was driven onto the Piana Bank and damaged.
Lovely Peggy	United Kingdom	The ship ran aground and was wrecked at Cardigan. Her crew were rescued. She was on a voyage from Milford Haven, Pembrokeshire to Cardigan.
Mary Campbell	United Kingdom	The ship was wrecked near Stornoway, Isle of Lewis, Outer Hebrides.
Mercurius	Russia	The full-rigged ship was wrecked at Bibbona, Grand Duchy of Tuscany with the loss of all but one of her crew. She was on a voyage from Odesa to Livorno.
Nelson	Greece	The brig was driven onto the Piana Bank and was damaged.
Pilleffs	Greece	The brig was driven ashore near the Calabrom, near Livorno.

== 30 January ==
List of shipwrecks: 30 January 1845
Ship	State	Description
Carnsew	France	The ship was driven ashore at Havre de Grâce, Seine-Inférieure. She was refloated.
Cassimir Perrier	Hamburg	The ship was driven ashore on the Oste. She was on a voyage from Cuxhaven to Hamburg. She was refloated on 2 February and taken in to Cuxhaven.
Joso	Netherlands	The ship departed from Malta for Amsterdam, North Holland. No further trace, presumed foundered with the loss of all hands.
Lithuania	Prussia	The ship was driven ashore at the Nakkehead Lighthouse, Denmark, She was on a voyage from Hartlepool, County Durham, United Kingdom to Memel. She was refloated on 3 February and taken in to Helsingør, Denmark for repairs.

== 31 January ==
List of shipwrecks: 31 January 1845
Ship	State	Description
Ann	United Kingdom	The schooner struck rocks and sank at Staithes, Yorkshire. Her crew survived. She was on a voyage from South Shields, County Durham to Ipswich, Suffolk.
Bamborough Castle	United Kingdom	The ship was in collision with Concordia (United Kingdom) and was severely damaged. She was consequently beached south of Bridlington, East Riding of Yorkshire. She was refloated on 7 February and taken in to Bridlington.
Belize	United Kingdom	The ship ran aground off Dundee, Forfarshire. She was refloated.
Dolphin	United Kingdom	The ship wasked at Lamlash, Isle of Arran.
Landdrost von Doring	Duchy of Holstein	The ship was wrecked on the Skarve Reef. Her crew were rescued. She was on a voyage from Hull, Yorkshire to Flensburg.
Queen of the Tyne	United Kingdom	The schooner ran aground on the Gorwick Sand Ridge, in the North Sea off the coast of Northumberland. All eleven people on board survived. She was on a voyage from Aberdeen to Newcastle upon Tyne, Northumberland. She was refloated on 24 February and towed into the River Tyne.
William Hannington	United Kingdom	The barque was driven ashore at Dungeness, Kent. She was on a voyage from Newcastle upon Tyne, Northumberland to Almería, Spain. She was refloated and put in to Portsmouth, Hampshire the next day.

== Unknown date ==
List of shipwrecks: Unknown date in January 1845
Ship	State	Description
Catherine McDonald	United Kingdom	The ship was in collision with the barque Panther (United States) and then was driven ashore at the Yapton Estate, Antigua. She was consequently condemned.
Chester	United Kingdom	The ship was driven ashore north of Bridlington, Yorkshire. She was refloated on 25 January but was driven ashore and wrecked.
Crusader	United Kingdom	The ship ran aground at Cork. She was on a voyage from Ichaboe Island, Portuguese West Africa to Cork. She was refloated on 12 January and taken in to Cork.
Dove	United Kingdom	The brig capsized in the Atlantic Ocean with the loss of three of her crew. She was on a voyage from a voyage from Liverpool, Lancashire to Dominica.
Eveline	United States	The brig was dismasted and abandoned in the Atlantic Ocean before 7 January.
Garonne	France	The ship was driven ashore in the Weser. She was on a voyage from St. Jago de Cuba, Cuba to Bremen. She was refloated on 10 January and taken in to Bremerhaven.
Gazelle	United Kingdom	The schooner was wrecked off Ichaboe Island, Portuguese West Africa before 20 January.
Glocester	United Kingdom	The ship foundered in the Atlantic Ocean off the coast of Brazil. Her crew were rescued. She was on a voyage from Patagonia, Argentina to an English port.
Ida	Prussia	The ship was discovered derelict at sea and was towed in to Danzig before 12 January. She was on a voyage from a Dutch port to Stettin.
Industry	United States	The ship was driven ashore on Antigua between 6 and 27 January. She was consequently condemned.
Lord Seaton	United Kingdom	The ship was wrecked in Penobscot Bay before 20 January with the loss of all hands. She was on a voyage from Liverpool, Lancashire to Saint Andrews, New Brunswick, British North America.
Mary Ann	United Kingdom	The ship was driven ashore in the Dry Tortugas before 24 January.
Victoria	Russia	The ship was driven ashore and damaged near Gallipoli, Ottoman Empire and was abandoned by her crew before 23 January. She was later refloated.
Wave	United Kingdom	The ship was lost in ice in the Baltic Sea.
