= Mercury Island =

Island off Namibia

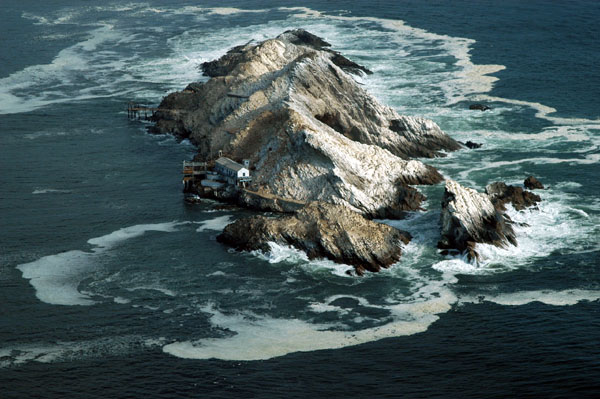
- Mercury Island from the air. Note the building on the center left of this photograph for scale.

- Location within Namibia

Geography
- Location: Atlantic Ocean
- Coordinates: 25.719161°S 14.832948°E
- Area: 0.03 km^{2} (0.012 sq mi)
- Length: 750 m (2460 ft)
- Width: 270 m (890 ft)
- Highest elevation: 38 m (125 ft)

Administration
- Namibia
- Region: ǁKaras Region
- Constituency: Lüderitz Constituency

Demographics
- Population: 2 (2006)

Mercury Island is a small rocky island off The Diamond Coast, Namibia. Despite its small size it is recognised by BirdLife International and other global conservation groups as an Important Bird Area (IBA) for its significant coastal seabird breeding.

== Situation ==
Mercury Island is situated 800 metres offshore in Spencer Bay, 110 kilometres north of Lüderitz. The island is only 750 metres long (North-South) and about 270 metres wide, reaching a height of 38 metres above sea level. Steep, rocky, without vegetation, covered in a thick layer of bird guano, and riddled with a number of caves (one of which completely bisects the island), Mercury Island's name comes from the shaking that reverberates through the island during westerly wave action. Its nearest neighbour and like bird habitat is Ichaboe Island, about 65 kilometres to the south. Ichaboe and Mercury are the two most important island seabird breeding sites along the Namibian coast. Today the island has a permanent population in the form of a two-person bird research station. The station sits on the remains of a bird guano mining dock on the northeast side of the island.

Mercury Island's three hectares are home to 16000 penguins, 1200 gannets, and 5000 cormorants, which range tens of kilometres out to sea, and return to the island to breed.

== Importance to wildlife ==
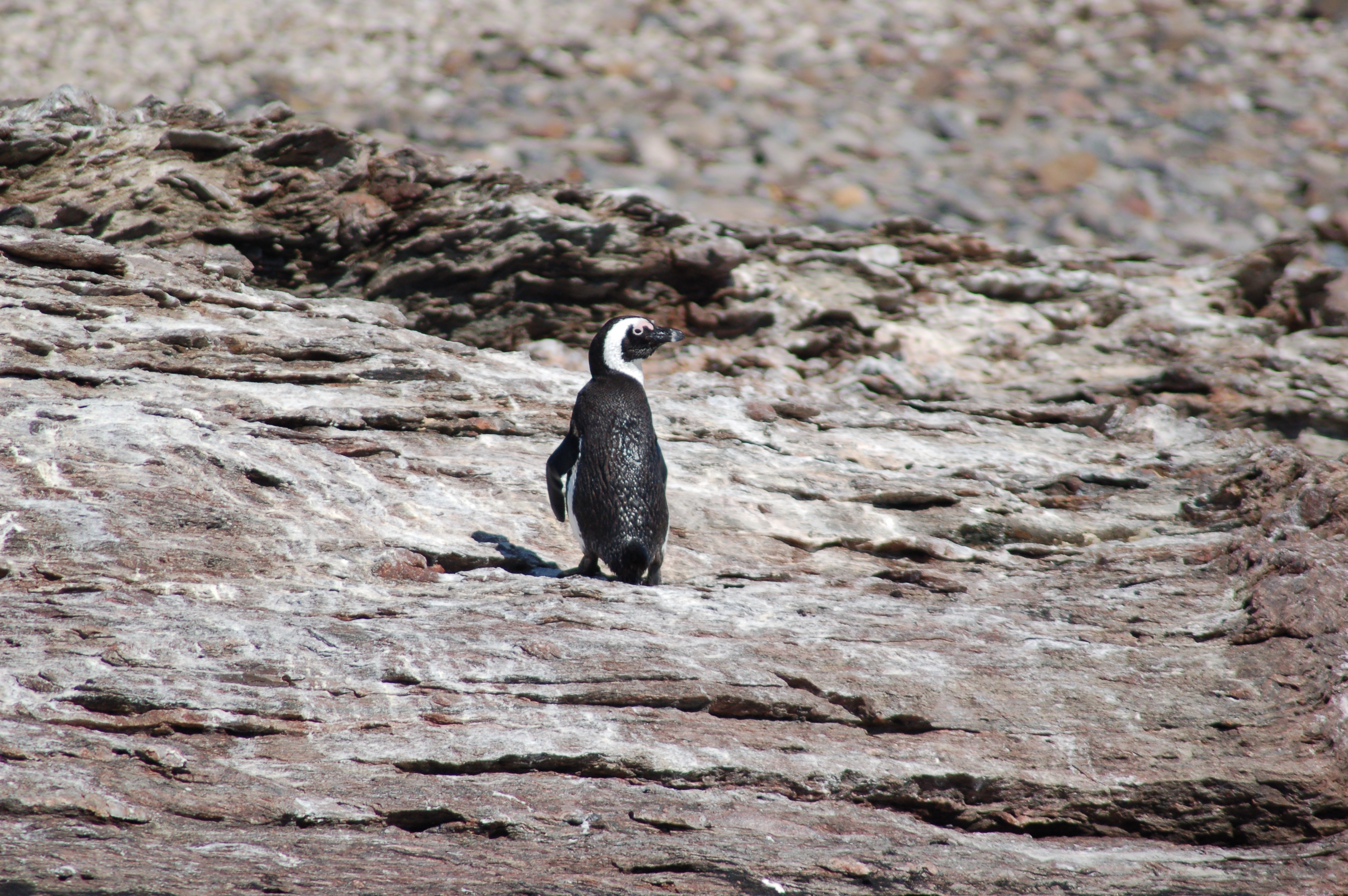
Mercury Island and nearby islands support 96% of Namibia's endangered African penguin population

BirdLife International considers Mercury Island as an Important Bird Area (IBA). Indeed the four Namibian islands of Mercury, Ichaboe, Halifax and Possession are critical for the breeding of a number of rare or endangered species of birds including the Cape gannets Morus capensis, the endangered African penguin Spheniscus demersus, and the crowned cormorants Microcarbo coronatus. Approximately 80% of the global population of the endangered bank cormorant Phalacrocorax neglectus breeds on Mercury and Ichaboe Islands. Migrating whales such as humpback whales and recovering southern right whales also visit the island during wintering seasons.

There is a dwelling on Mercury Island, which is frequented by scientists and conservationists monitoring wildlife in the area.

== History ==
An American sealing captain, Captain Benjamin Morrell, in 1832 wrote in his (ghost-written) memoirs, A Narrative of Four Voyages, that the guano deposits on Ichaboe Island were 25 feet deep. He averred that a $30,000 investment would produce in two years a profit of "from ten to fifteen hundred per cent."

Liverpool businessman Andrew Livingston investigated the claim, with the result that a guano rush developed. Exploitation began in 1841, and between 1843 and 1845 some 450 boats lay off Ichaboe as their crews retrieved over 300,000 tons of guano. The rush extended to Mercury and other Namibian islands. The guano extraction destroyed the habitat that had drawn breeding seabirds which had created the deposits.

Captain Owen Owens and 19 crew members from SS Point Pleasant Park landed on Mercury on 2 March 1945 after the German submarine U-510 had sunk their vessel on 23 February. The fishing vessel Boy Russell rescued them, taking them to Luderitz, South West Africa.

== See also ==
- Penguin Islands

== Citations and references ==
Citations

References

- Morrell, Benjamin (1832). A Narrative of Four Voyages...etc. New York: J & J Harper.
