= Treaty on Walvis Bay =

1994 treaty transferring control of Walvis Bay to Namibia

Treaty between the Government of the Republic of South Africa and the Government of the Republic of Namibia with respect to Walvis Bay and the Off-shore Islands
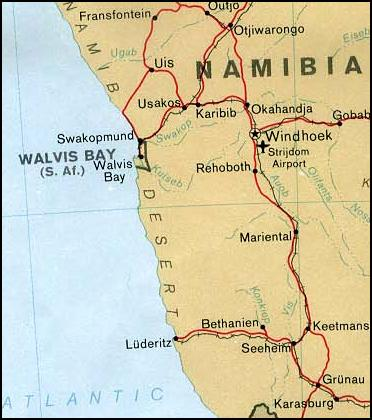
- Location of Walvis Bay relative to Namibia
- Signed: 28 February 1994
- Location: Walvis Bay
- Effective: 1 March 1994
- Original signatories: (Namibia) Ngarikutuke Tjiriange; (South Africa) Kobie Coetsee
- Parties: Namibia; South Africa
- Language: English

The Treaty on Walvis Bay is a treaty which transferred control of Walvis Bay and the Penguin Islands from South Africa to Namibia. It was signed on 28 February 1994 by Kobie Coetsee for South Africa and Ngarikutuke Tjiriange for Namibia, and came into force on 1 March 1994.

== Background ==
Walvis Bay is the only natural harbour on the coastline of what is now Namibia. It was claimed for Britain in 1878 and formally annexed as an exclave of the Cape Colony in 1884. The rest of what is now the republic of Namibia, including the coastline north and south of Walvis Bay, was colonised by the German Empire as German South West Africa. At the formation of the Union of South Africa, Walvis Bay became part of the Cape Province of the Union.

During World War I South African troops conquered and occupied the German colony, and in 1920 South Africa was granted a League of Nations mandate to administer it as the Territory of South West Africa (SWA). In 1922 the Parliament of South Africa enacted that Walvis Bay was to be administered as part of SWA.

In 1977, with international pressure mounting on South Africa to allow Namibian independence, the South African government detached Walvis Bay from SWA and transferred its administration back to the Cape Province. The position of the South African government was that Walvis Bay remained an integral part of South Africa notwithstanding the 55 years that it had been de facto integrated into SWA. The UN General Assembly condemned South Africa's action as an "annexation", while United Nations Security Council Resolution 432 called for the "reintegration" of Walvis Bay into SWA/Namibia.

Namibia achieved independence in 1990, and its constitution explicitly declared Walvis Bay to be Namibian territory, but the South African government dismissed this claim.

== Negotiations ==
Settlement of the Walvis Bay question was tied up with the negotiations to end apartheid in South Africa. During the first plenary session of the Convention for a Democratic South Africa (CODESA) negotiations in December 1991, Namibian diplomats circulated a resolution proposing the reintegration of Walvis Bay with Namibia. Neither this resolution, nor continued lobbying at the second CODESA plenary in May 1992, met with success. However bilateral negotiations led to the establishment in November 1992 of a Joint Administrative Authority for Walvis Bay, on which Namibia and South Africa were equally represented.

The Multi-Party Negotiating Forum (MPNF), the next phase of the negotiations to end apartheid, began in April 1993. One of the topics of discussion at the MPNF was the demarcation of South Africa into new provinces; to this end the National Party submitted a proposal that Walvis Bay should be included in the Western Cape province of South Africa, thus re-igniting the question of Walvis Bay. The African National Congress and other liberation movements supported the Namibian claim. On 16 August 1993 the Negotiating Council of the MPNF passed a resolution calling for the incorporation of Walvis Bay and the off-shore islands into Namibia at the earliest possible opportunity.

The final treaty was signed by the justice ministers of Namibia and South Africa in Walvis Bay on 28 February 1994, with the transfer of control set to take place on the following day. A number of other technical agreements regulating effects of the transfer were signed in February–May 1994. The agreement was given legislative force by the Transfer of Walvis Bay to Namibia Act, 1993 in South Africa and the Walvis Bay and Off-shore Islands Act, 1994 in Namibia, which also regulated legal consequences of the transfer.

== Articles ==
The treaty consists of six articles.

- Article 1 defines "Walvis Bay", describing the territory to be transferred.
- Article 2 declares that Walvis Bay shall be "incorporated/reintegrated" into Namibia on 1 March 1994.
- Article 3 dissolves the Joint Administrative Authority.
- Article 4 provides that all unresolved issues related to the transfer should be settled by agreement as soon as possible.
- Article 5 provides that all disputes should be resolved by good faith diplomacy.
- Article 6 provides that the treaty shall come into force on the date of transfer.
