= Halifax Island =

Island in Namibia

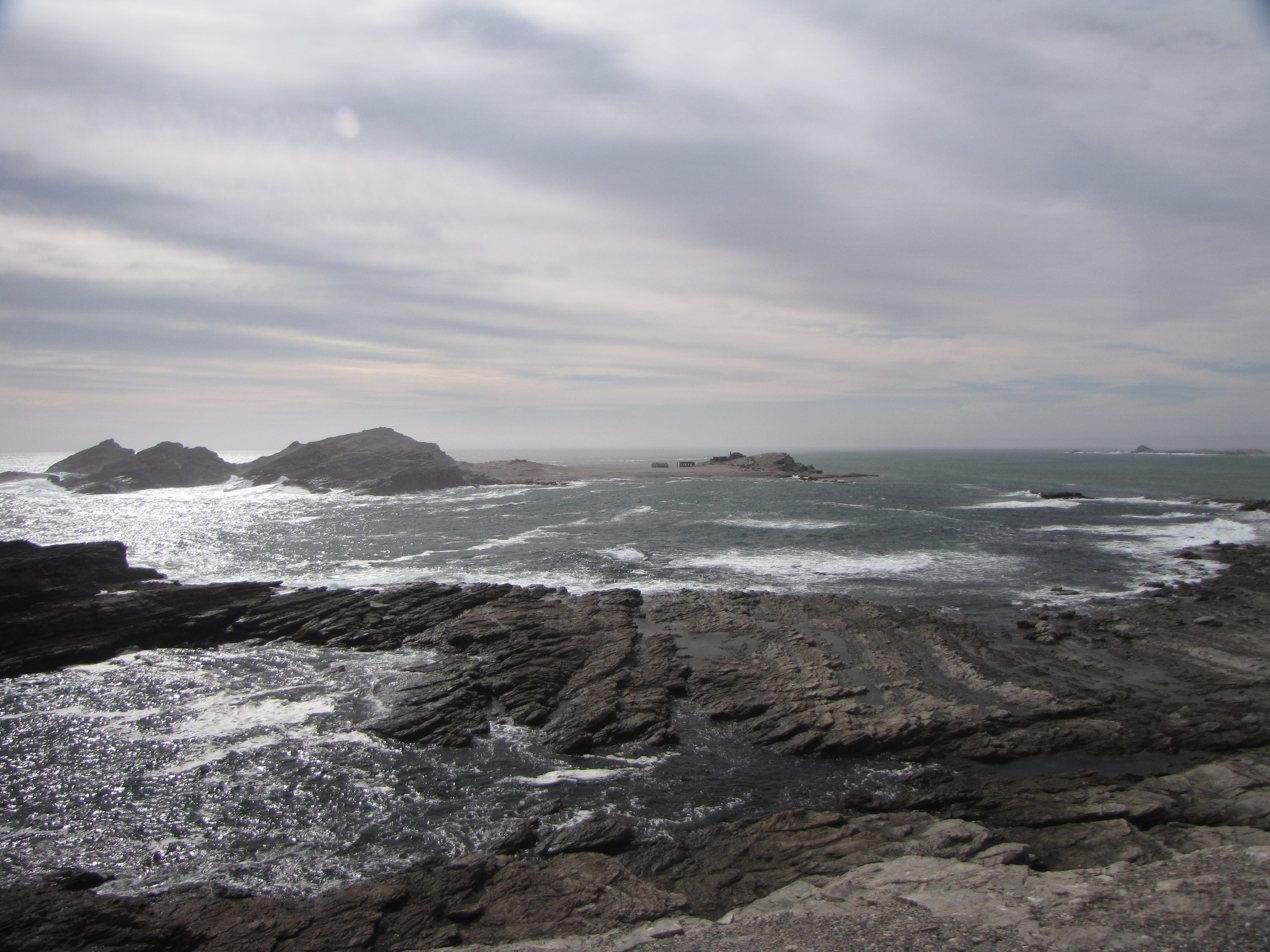

- Location within Namibia

Geography
- Coordinates: 26.651111°S 15.08°E
- Area: 0.1 km^{2} (0.039 sq mi)

Halifax Island is a small, rocky Namibian island about 100 m (330 ft) from the mainland, near Lüderitz. It is the third most important breeding site for African penguins in Namibia.

== History ==
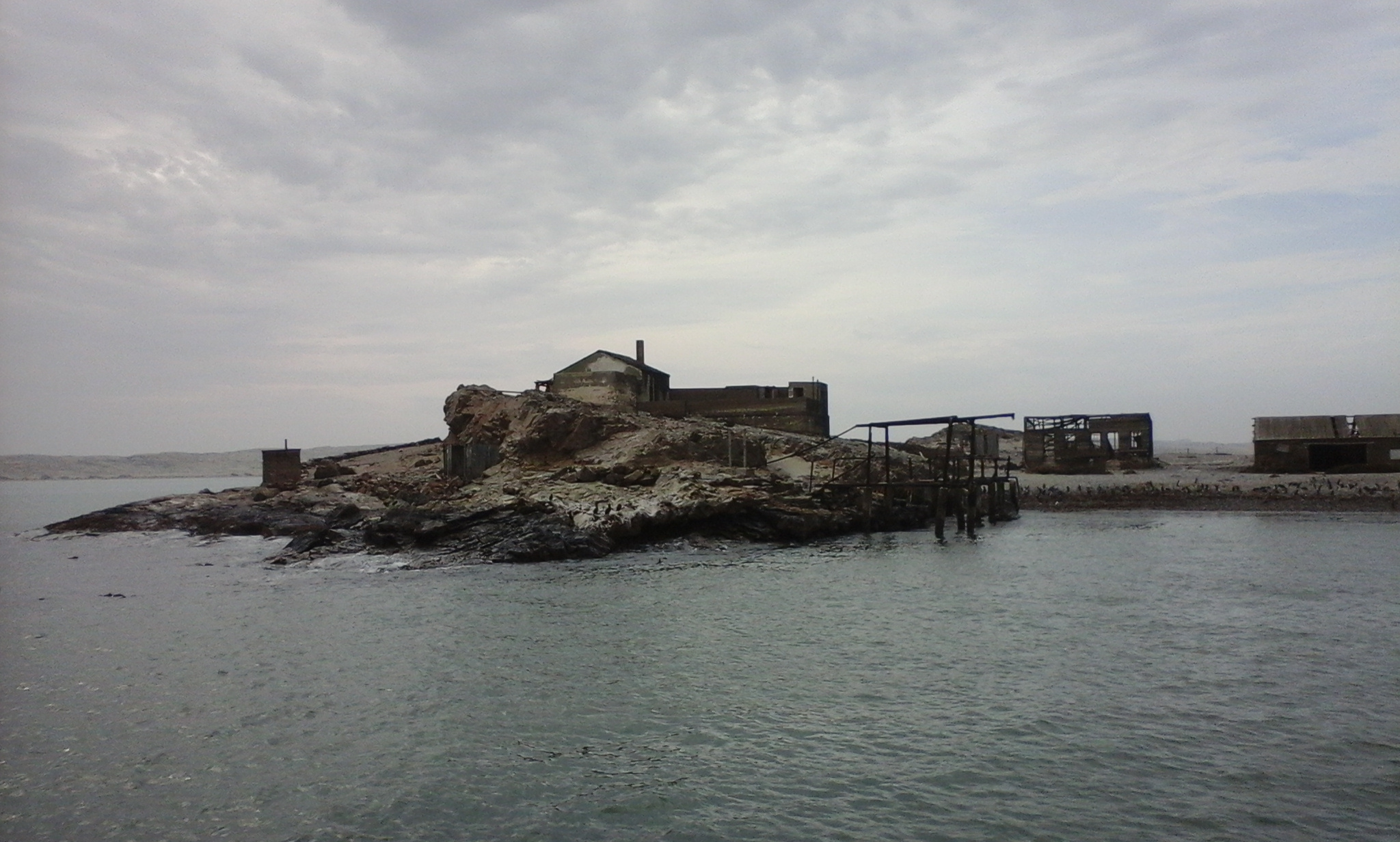
The abandoned Guano mining station

Captain Charles C. Forsyth of the Cape of Good Hope Station was ordered to take possession of the Penguin Islands and Lüderitz Bay. Captain Forsyth proclaimed British sovereignty over the islands on 5 May 1866. He landed on Halifax Island two days later on HMS Valorous and erected a board claiming the island in the name of the British monarch. Colonial Administrator Philip Wodehouse leased the Penguin Islands in 1867 to De Pass, Spence & Co. and to Robert Granger until 1895. They were given exclusive rights to mine guano and hunt seals.

Penguin guano on the island was 120 feet (37 m) deep in the early 19th century and mining continued until 1949. The penguin population on the island has halved in the 30 years between 1970 and 2000. Houses and sheds used by guano miners and the local headman are currently in various stages of deterioration. The uninhabited buildings are now used by penguins for breeding. The Namibian Government's Ministry of Fisheries and Marine Resources currently manages the island and monitors the seabird population.

== Location ==
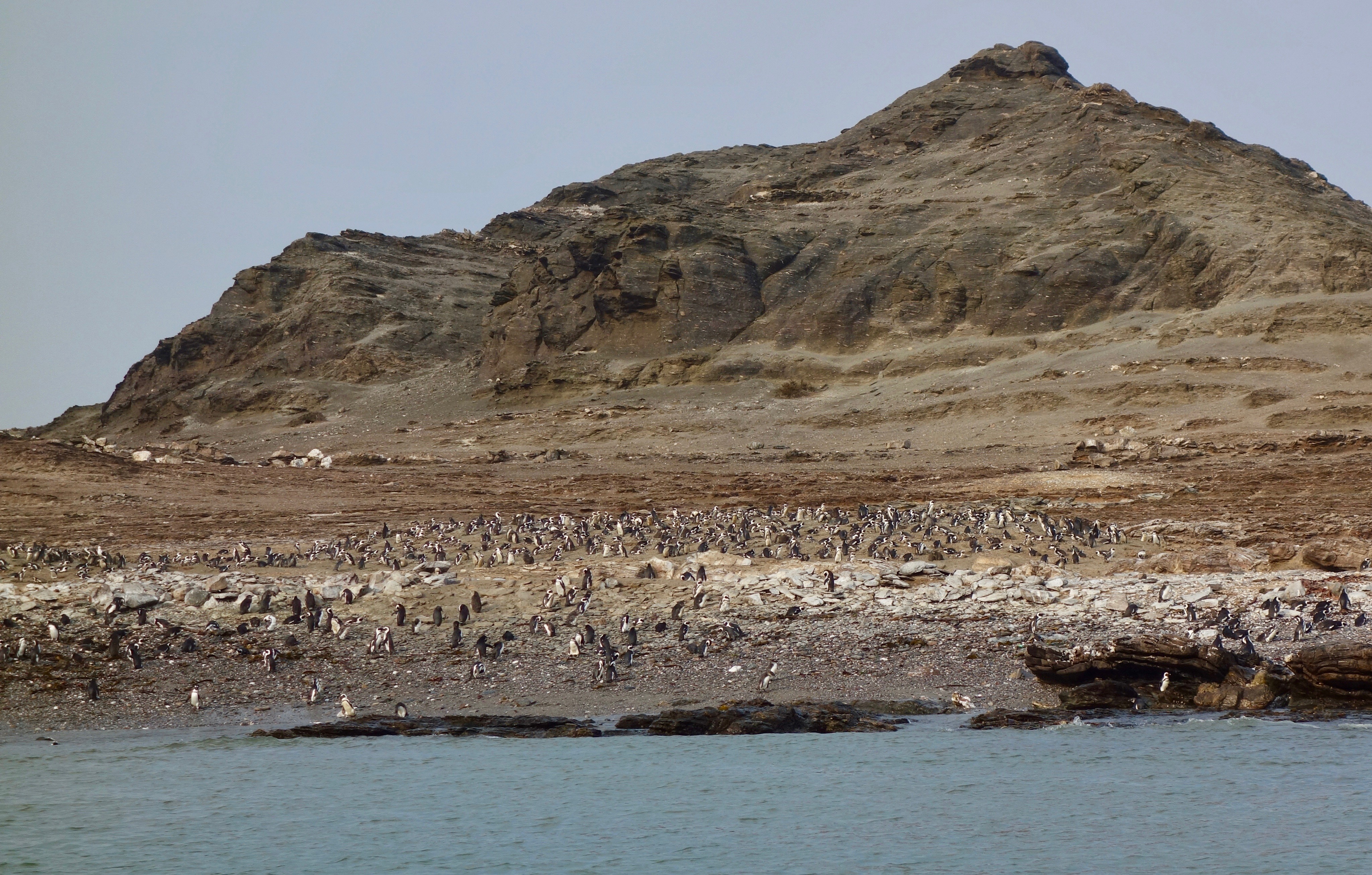
Penguin colonies on the island

The island is visited by catamaran tours from Lüderitz. The island itself is out of bounds for the public, even though the catamarans are allowed to sail past the island to offer a view of the penguins.

== Fauna ==
The island is also home to colonies of Kelp gulls, with around 350 nests recorded in the summer of 2000. Their numbers are bolstered by the nearby dump in Lüderitz. Increase in gull population has been problematic to penguin eggs which are eaten by the gulls. Crowned cormorant, Greater crested tern and Hartlaub's gull are also found to breed in the island. A pilot project in May 2001 led to three African oystercatcher fledglings successfully introduced on the island. Cape cormorant and White-breasted cormorant are observed to roost on the island. Cape wagtail, Turnstone, Greater flamingo and Whimbrel have also been sighted in the island. Heaviside's dolphin are occasionally spotted in the bay. Brown fur seal sometimes visit to prey on the penguins.
