= Penguin Island, Namibia =

Island in Lüderitz Bay, Namibia

Penguin Island
- Location within Namibia

Geography
- Location: Lüderitz Bay, Namibia
- Coordinates: 26°37′S 15°9′E
- Area: 36 ha (89 acres)

Penguin Island is an island of Namibia. It is located in Lüderitz Bay, south of Seal Island.
