= Possession Island (Namibia) =

Island in Namibia

Geography
- Location: Karas Region
- Coordinates: 27°00′43″S 15°11′35″E
- Area: 0.8 km^{2} (0.31 sq mi)
- Highest elevation: 8 m (26 ft)

Administration
- Namibia

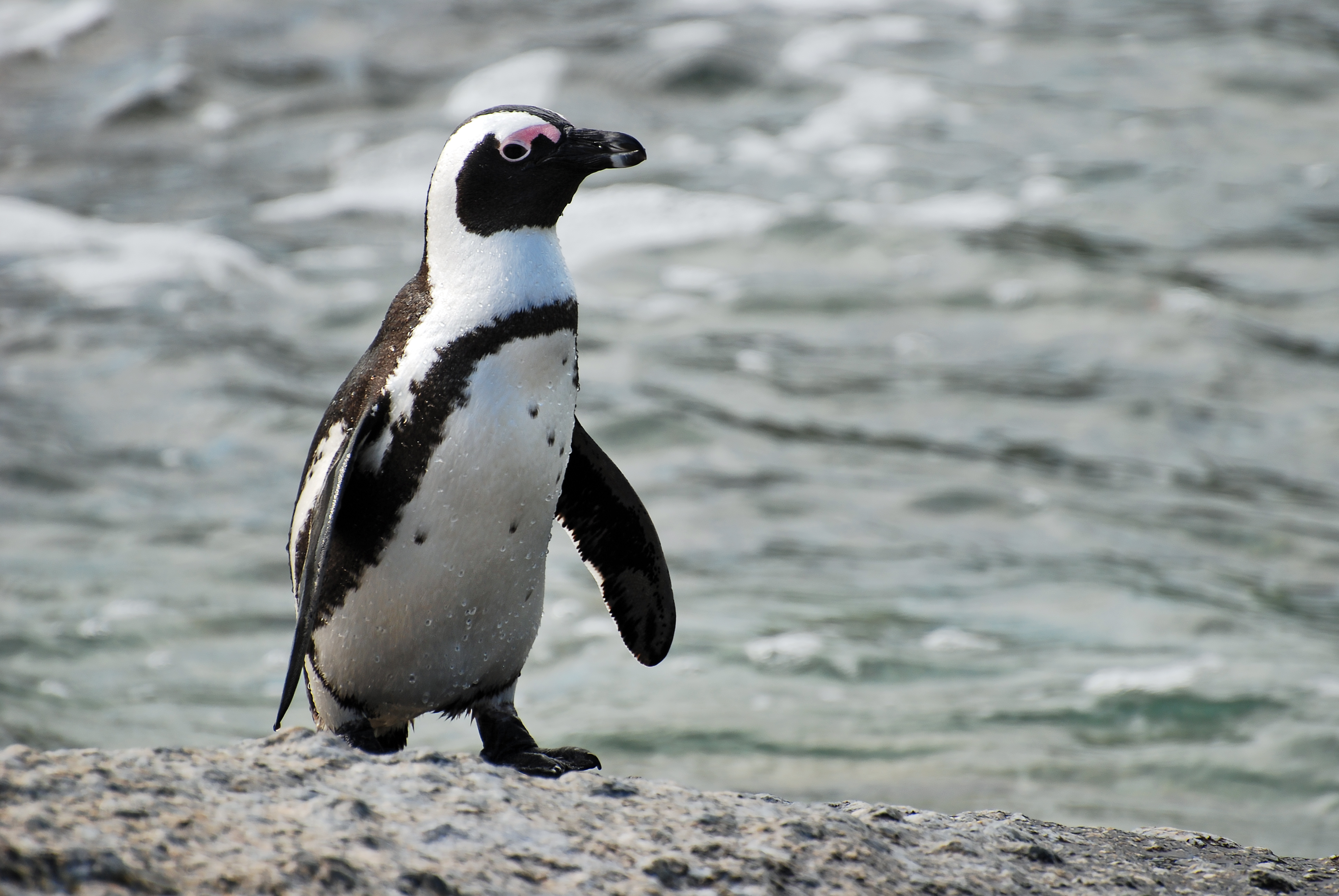
African penguin

Possession Island is the largest of the Penguin Islands, a scattered group of small islands and rocks to the south of Namibia. It is the largest among the country's coastal islands, with an area of 80 hectares (200 acres), and is located 1.6 kilometres (0.99 mi) away from the Diamond Coast and 40 kilometres (25 mi) to the south of Lüderitz, on Lüderitz Bay.

It features arid and rocky ground, with occasional shrubbery and low vegetation where some species of bird nest, the African penguin among them. In the 1950s, the island had the largest population of African penguins in Namibia, with around 46,000 adults; however by 2001, only 2,000 remained. In 2008, a report published by WWF South Africa estimated around 1,400 penguins remained, with a continued decline of around 8% a year being observed in their numbers.

For several years, the island was a guano collecting spot, and therefore had a small population engaged in collecting the product.

The island was also known, in the 18th century, as Thompson's Island.

== See also ==
- List of Antarctic and subantarctic islands
