= Seal Island, Namibia =

Island in Lüderitz Bay, Namibia

Seal Island
- Location within Namibia

Geography
- Location: Lüderitz Bay, Namibia
- Coordinates: 26°36′S 15°9′E
- Area: 44 ha (110 acres)

Seal Island is an island of Namibia. It is located in Lüderitz Bay, north of Penguin Island and west of Agate Beach.
