= Lüderitz Bay =

Atlantic Ocean bay in south-west Africa

- Lüderitzbaai (Afrikaans)
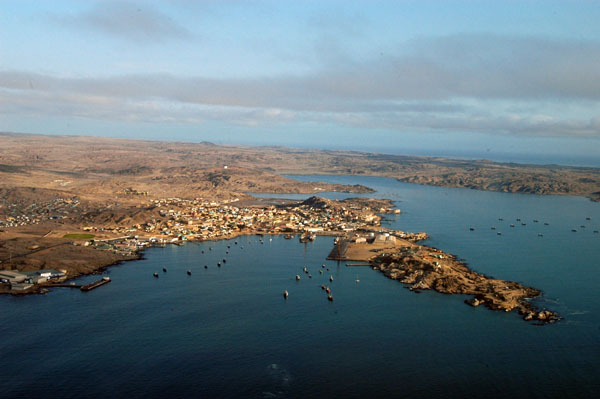
- View of the eastern headland and the inner bay.

- Lüderitz town in the inner eastern bay
- Coordinates: 26°37′S 15°9′E
- Etymology: Adolf Lüderitz
- Ocean/sea sources: Atlantic Ocean
- Basin countries: Namibia
- Max. length: 7.5 km (4.7 mi)
- Max. width: 5 km (3.1 mi)
- Islands: Penguin Island and Seal Island
- Settlements: Lüderitz

Lüderitz Bay (Afrikaans: Lüderitzbaai; German: Lüderitzbucht), also known as Angra Pequena (Portuguese: [ˈɐ̃ɡɾɐ pɨˈkenɐ], "small cove"), is a bay in the coast of Namibia, Africa. The city of Lüderitz is located at the edge of the bay.

== Geography ==
The bay is indented and complex in structure. It opens to the Atlantic Ocean in the west. Lüderitz town is located in the southern shore of the inner eastern bay, which is known as Angra Pequena in Portuguese and opens towards the north. Further west Griffith Bay, a deep inlet, stretches southwards in the southern part.

The bay west of 'Angra Point' is known as Shearwater Bay, the location of a proposed port for the export of amongst other things, coal from Botswana. This requires the construction of the 1600 km Trans-Kalahari Railway.

There are two islands facing Agate Beach in the northeastern part of the bay, Penguin Island and Seal Island.

In the southern part of the bay, a course has been created to hold the Lüderitz Speed Challenge, an annual speed sailing event.

== History ==
The easternmost bay was named Angra Pequena when first mapped in 1487 by Portuguese explorer Bartolomeu Dias, although in some maps it appeared as Angra de São Christóvão. In 1883 the bay area was made into a trading station by German trader Adolf Lüderitz. He renamed it Lüderitz and concluded treaties with the neighbouring chiefs, who ceded large tracts of country to the newcomers. Under the belief that Britain was about to claim the area as a protectorate, Lüderitz transferred his rights over the bay on 24 April 1884 to the German Imperial Government, and on the following 7 August Chancellor Otto von Bismarck proclaimed a German protectorate over the station and the surrounding area.

Renamed Lüderitzbucht (Lüderitz Bay) by the Germans, the location then became a naval base for German South West Africa, modern day Namibia.

On 11 December 1904 the Russian fleet proceeding to the pacific to fight the Battle of Tsushima of stopped at the bay to take on coal. The process was delayed by poor weather and the fleet left on 17 December.

The two islands off Agate Beach, rich in guano deposits, were annexed by Great Britain in 1867 and added to Cape Colony in 1874 as part of the offshore territory known as Penguin Islands.

== See also ==
- Walvis Bay
- Shark Island Concentration Camp
