= Ichaboe Island =

Island in ǁKaras Region, Namibia

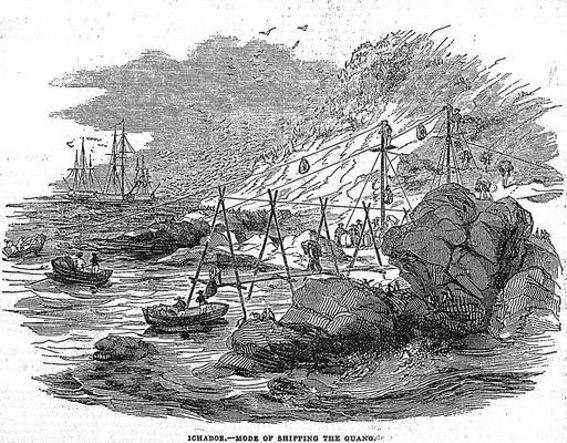
- Mode of Shipping the Guano, Ichaboe Island, Namibia (1844)

- Location within Namibia

Geography
- Location: Atlantic Ocean
- Coordinates: 26.288889°S 14.936667°E
- Area: 0.065 km^{2} (0.025 sq mi)
- Highest elevation: 7 m (23 ft)

Administration
- Namibia
- Region: ǁKaras Region
- Constituency: Lüderitz Constituency

Ichaboe Island is a small rocky island off Namibia's Diamond Coast. It is recognised by BirdLife International as an Important Bird Area (IBAs) for its seabird breeding colonies.

== Geography ==
There are twelve small islands on the Namibian coast between Walvis Bay and the Orange River. Due to the Benguela Current, the seas on the west coast of southern Africa are some of the most productive in the world. The current flows north from the Southern Ocean and offshore winds drive the surface water away from the coast. Water rises from depths of hundreds of metres and at speeds of up to 12 m per minute bringing nutrients to the surface. A combination of sunlight and nutrients provide the conditions for phytoplankton which are the foundation for other life in the Benguela marine ecosystem. Feeding on the phytoplankton are Zooplankton, which attract an abundance of shoaling pelagic fish and this is the reason why southern Africa is home to one of the richest seabird communities in the world. The islands off the west coast of southern Africa provide refuge from predators. Cape gannet (Morus capensis) and Cape cormorants (Phalacrocorax capensis) are the region's most abundant seabirds with tens of thousands on the islands during the nesting season. The birds' guano also provide nutrients that flow back into the surrounding sea when large waves hit the island or when it rains. The guano enriches the rocky shore with carpets of seaweed grazed by goat's-eye limpets, which are predated by spiny starfish.

Ichaboe Island is a 6.5 ha low-lying island, approximately 1.5 km off the Diamond Coast of Namibia and 48 km north of Lüderitz. On the western side of the island is a reef which offers some protection from Atlantic waves, although sea spray covers the island during storms. The island was once covered in over 7 m of bird-droppings (guano), which was quarried in the 19th and 20th-centuries for sale as manure. The rocky ground is now entirely exposed and the eastern side has some sandy areas. Annual rainfall is less than 10 mm and coastal fog is frequent.

Bird Life International recognizes Ichaboe Island along with other islands such as Mercury Island and the nearby coast as an Important Bird Area for their seabird colonies.

== History ==
In the early 19th-century Ichaboe and other islands of the South African coast witnessed the guano rush, equivalent of the American gold rush. The island was once used for sealing and following a visit in 1828 by Captain Benjamin Morrell and the discovery of bird manure to depths of more than 7 m, the focus turned to the quarrying of guano. At one time more than 400 ships anchored off the island and shanty towns housed thousands of workers. Large-scale scraping and bagging of "white gold" began in 1843 and peaked two years later. The value was so great that competition was fierce; murder was committed over harvesting rights, and two British warships were dispatched to restore order over what became known as the "Great Guano War". Britain took possession of the island on 21 June 1861. Guano has been taken off the island regularly, and in 1880 and 1881, Ichaboe Guano was claimed to be the "richest and most fertilising guano imported into England" containing 12 to 13% ammonia and 27 to 30% guano phosphates. The island was administered by the Cape Provincial Administration of South Africa and became a nature reserve in 1987. The islands were returned to Namibia in 1994 and are managed by the Ministry of Fisheries and Marine Resources (MFMR). Ichaboe, along with Mercury and Possession Islands, have permanent residents who partake in research and conservation of the seabirds. Scraping of guano continues with concessions granted during the 1980s and in 2000 a wall was put up around the perimeter of the island. The wall was built to prevent winds blowing the guano into the sea and has a few entry points for penguins to access the breeding areas.

== Fauna ==
Ichaboe regularly supports over 50,000 seabirds of at least eight species and is consequently one of the most important and densely packed seabird breeding in the world. The island holds 65% of the world's endangered Cape cormorant (Phalacrocorax capensis), despite the global population falling from 9,000 to less than 5,000 pairs over twenty years. Namibia is home to 4,000 of those pairs. The island is the most important location in the world for the near-threatened, crowned cormorant (Phalacrocorax coronatus), having 4% of the world's breeding population. Ichaboe also has large numbers of endangered African penguin (Spheniscus demersus) and the bank cormorant (Phalacrocorax neglectus), as well as the vulnerable Cape gannet (Morus capensis). Smaller numbers of kelp gull (Larus dominicanus) and African oystercatcher (Haematopus moquini) also breed here. Thousands of common tern (Sterna hirundo) and black tern (Chlidonias niger) may roost on the island.

Whales sighted off the island include the humpback whale (Megaptera novaeangliae) and southern right whale (Eubalaena australis). The cetaceans include, dusky dolphin (Lagenorhynchus obscurus), common bottlenose dolphin (Tursiops truncatus) and the endemic, Heaviside's dolphin (Cephalorhynchus heavisidii).
