= Lüderitz (disambiguation) =

Lüderitz is a town in the ǁKaras Region of southern Namibia.

Lüderitz may also refer to:

== Places ==
=== Namibia ===
Several places in Namibia have been named after Adolf Lüderitz, a German merchant and colonialist:

- Lüderitz Airport
- Lüderitz Bay, next to the town
- Lüderitz railway station
- ǃNamiǂNûs Constituency (formerly Lüderitz Constituency), an electoral constituency in Namibia
- Naval Calling Station Luderitz

=== Europe ===
- Łabiszyn, a town in Poland that was named Lüderitz between 1940 and 1945
- Lüderitz, Germany, a village in Germany

== People ==
- Adolf Lüderitz (1834–1886), German merchant and founder of German South West Africa
- Alexander Lüderitz (born 1973), German former freestyle swimmer
- Carl Lüderitz (1854–1930), German doctor and scientist
- Elisabeth Lüderitz (1858–1930), German painter
- Hermann Lüderitz (1864–1909), German diplomat
- Wolfgang Lüderitz (composer) (1926–2012), German composer of choral music
- Wolfgang Lüderitz (pentathlete) (born 1936), German modern pentathlete

== Other ==
- German fleet tender Adolf Lüderitz, a fleet tender of the Kriegsmarine
- Lüderitz Reformed Church, a congregation of the Reformed Churches in South Africa (GKSA) in southern Namibia
- Lüderitz Speed Challenge, an annual speed sailing event
- Monelytrum luederitzianum, a grass endemic to Namibia, commonly known in English as Lüderitz grass
