= Imperial Schutztruppe for German South West Africa =

Military formation of the German South West Africa from 1895 to 1919

- Kaiserliche Schutztruppe für Deutsch-Südwestafrika
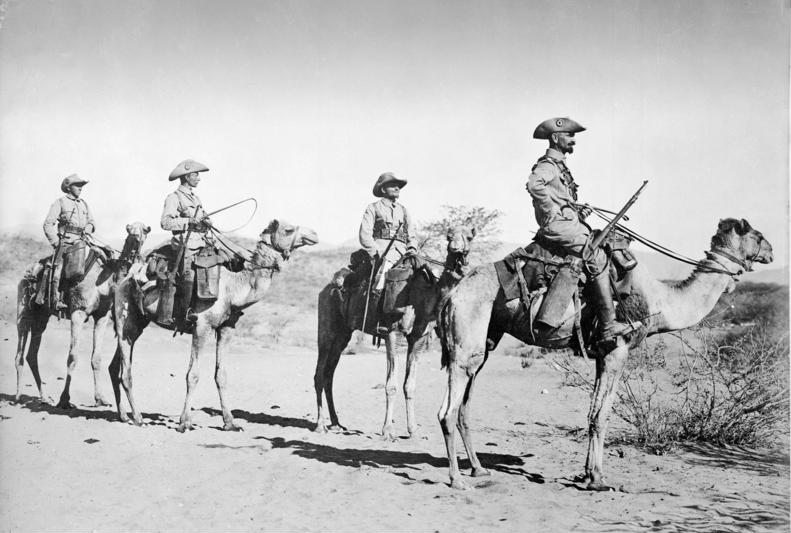
- Camel patrol, German South West Africa, 1907
- Founded: 9 June 1895
- Disbanded: October 1919
- Country: German South West Africa
- Allegiance: German Empire
- Type: Infantry; Mounted infantry Artillery
- Part of: Schutztruppe
- Engagements: Herero Wars; South West Africa campaign

The Imperial Schutztruppe for German South West Africa (German: Kaiserliche Schutztruppe für Deutsch-Südwestafrika) was the official name of the military formation that maintained the Imperial German rule in its colony of German South West Africa. The Schutztruppe are held responsible for numerous atrocities in the Herero and Nama uprising in 1904. During World War I, the Schutztruppe was defeated by the military of the Union of South Africa.

== Formation ==
Heinrich Vogelsang acquired the bay of Angra Pequena and five miles of hinterland for the Bremen tobacconist Adolf Lüderitz on 1 May 1883 from the Nama people in Bethanie. On April 24, 1884 Bismarck telegraphed the German consul in Cape Town that "Lüderitzland is under the protection of the German Empire".

Between October 1888 and July 1889, in the course of a dispute between the Witbooi and the Herero, there had been an expulsion of the German Commissariat and an interruption of German sovereignty in Okahandja. The German Colonial Society engaged Hauptmann Curt von François to provide security to the territory. In June 1889 he arrived with 21 soldiers, eight staff from the Imperial German Army and 13 volunteers, at the British-held enclave of Walvis Bay. The formal establishment of the Schutztruppe for German South West Africa was carried out by the Reich Law of 9 June 1895. The support of these troops was the responsibility of the respective protectorates (Reich Law on the Income and Expenses of the Protected Areas of 30 March 1892, RGBl. p. 369).

== Structure ==
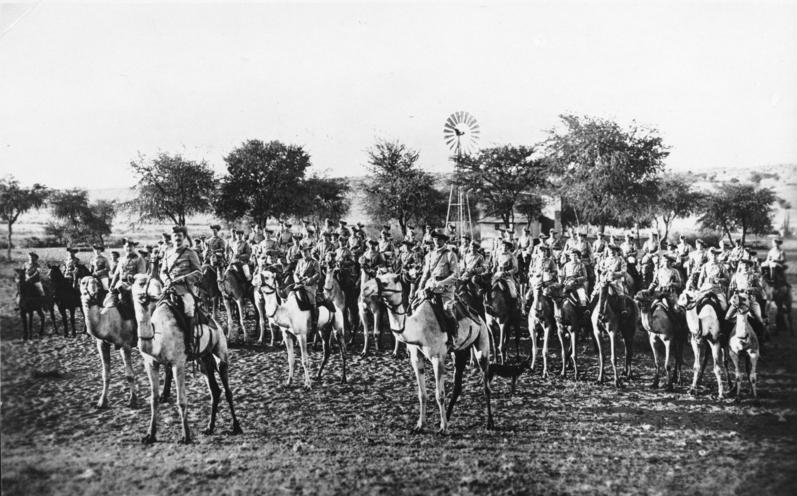
Camel cavalry, German South West Africa, 1904

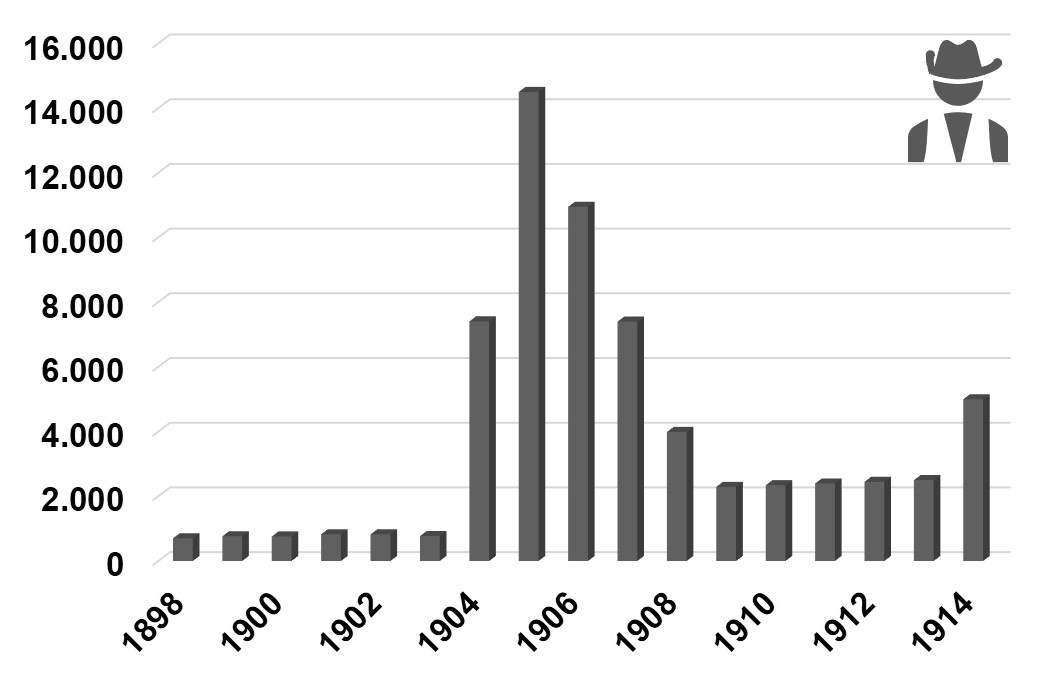
Numbers of members of the Schutztruppe for German South West Africa per year (1898–1914) (missing data for the years 1906 and 1910–1912 were supplemented by mean values).

The Schutztruppe in German South West Africa was structured in 12 companies of mounted infantry totalling ca. 2,000 men in July 1914, primarily Germans. The 7th Company, stationed in the northern desert area of the colony, was mounted on imported camels. A single unit, called the Baster Company of non-local Africans was raised and deployed. Relations between the German administration and the natives in this colony had deteriorated to the point that few local Africans were recruited; however, some Boers enlisted in the Schuztruppe due to their desire to establish a sovereign Afrikaner nation independent from British control.

The colonial forces for German South West Africa consisted of volunteers from the imperial army and navy (including some Austrians), but essentially consisted of members of German regiments. Before their deployment to Africa these troops were prepared for their special tasks and future environment. Such a training base was at Karlsruhe. Because of the often humid conditions in the upper Rhine valley of the Grand Duchy of Baden, the area provided some early acclimatization.

The structure of the Southwest African forces was as follows: German Southwest Africa Command at Windhuk (modern Windhoek) consisted of headquarters, administration and legal (judge advocate), medical corps, surveying and mapping units.

Northern district command: Windhuk

- 1st Company: Regenstein, Seeis
- 4th Company: Okanjande
- 6th Company: Outjo and Otavi
- 2nd Battery: Johann-Albrechts-Höhe
- Transport platoon 1: Karibib
- Office for provisions: Karibib
- Horse depot: Okawayo
- Artillery and train depot: Windhuk
- Military hospital and medical depot: Windhuk
- Clothing depot: Windhuk
- Local headquarters: Windhuk
- Local headquarters and quartermaster: Swakopmund

Southern district command: Keetmanshoop

- 2nd Company: Ukamas
- 3rd Company: Kanus
- 5th Company: Chamis and Churutabis
- 7th and 8th Company (camel cavalry), military hospital: Gochas and Arahoab
- 1st Battery: Narubis
- 3rd Battery: Gibeon
- Transport platoon 2: Keetmanshoop
- Artillery and train depot: Keetmanshoop
- Military hospital and medical depot: Keetmanshoop
- Clothing depot: Keetmanshoop
- Office for provisions: Keetmanshoop
- Garrison administration: Keetmanshoop
- Horse depot: Aus
- Camel stud farm: Kalkfontein
- Local headquarters and quartermaster: Lüderitz

At the outbreak of World War I the force had a total strength of 91 officers, 22 physicians, 9 veterinarians, 59 civilian administrators, ammunition technicians, 342 NCOs and 1,444 German other ranks for a total of 1,967 personnel.

== Historiography ==
Its records were lost during the world wars, complicating research efforts.

== Bibliography ==
- Farwell, Byron (1989). The Great War in Africa, 1914–1918. New York: W. W. Norton & Company. ISBN 0-393-30564-3.
