= German fleet tender Carl Peters =

Fleet tender of Nazi Germany

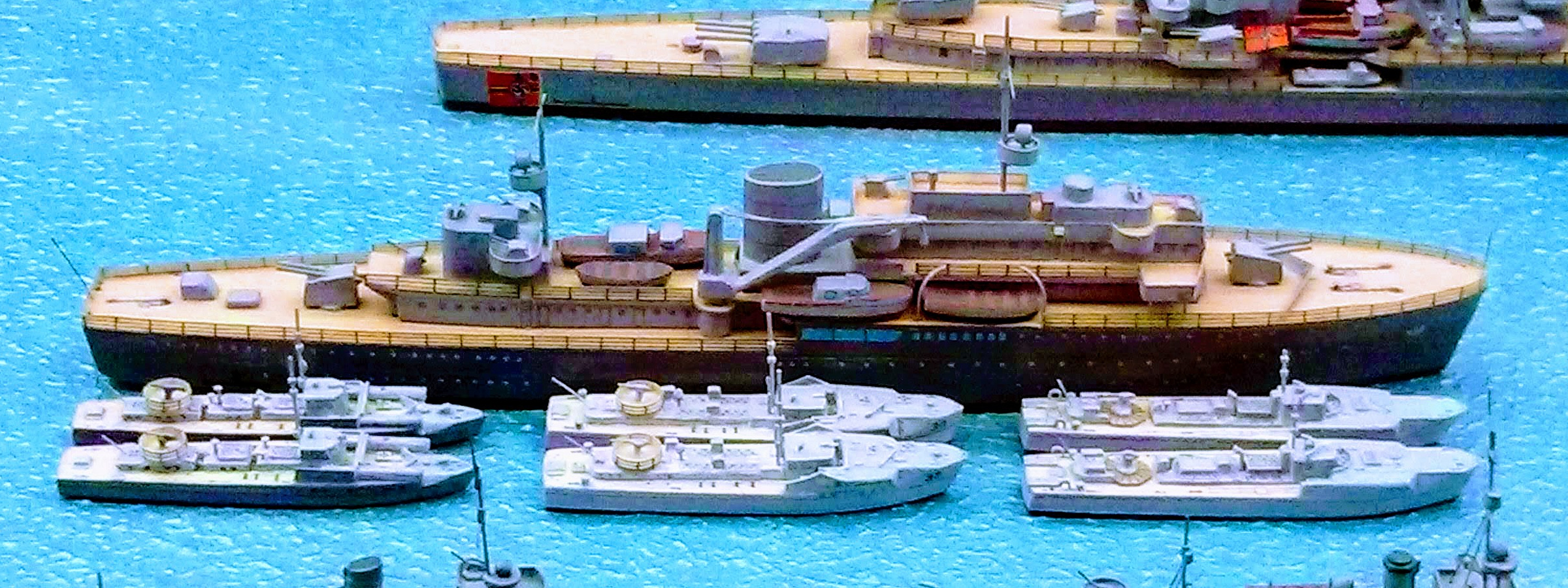
- Model of Carl Peter's sister ship Adolf Lüderitz

History

Nazi Germany
- Name: Carl Peters
- Namesake: Carl Peters
- Ordered: 1938
- Builder: Neptun Werft
- Laid down: 1938
- Launched: 13 April 1939
- Acquired: 6 January 1940
- Commissioned: 6 January 1940
- Fate: Sunk by mine, 10 May 1945

General characteristics
- Type: Depot ship
- Displacement: 3,600 tonnes (3,500 long tons) at full load
- Length: 144 m (472 ft 5 in)
- Beam: 14.5 m (47 ft 7 in)
- Draft: 4.34 m (14 ft 3 in)
- Propulsion: 4 × MAN 6-cyl diesel engines; 2 × shafts; 1,240 hp (920 kW)
- Speed: 23 knots (43 km/h)
- Complement: 225 crew
- Armament: 2 × dual 10.5 cm SK L/45 naval guns; 1 × single 4 cm Flak 28s; 6 × single 3.7 cm SK C/30s; 8 × 2 cm Flak 30s

The Carl Peters was a fleet tender of the Kriegsmarine, sometimes also known as an aviso. She was named after the German Africa explorer Carl Peters.

== Development and design ==
For their growing number of small craft, the Reichsmarine and later the Kriegsmarine needed appropriately equipped escort ships for each flotilla, which served the boat crews as accommodation and the boats as fuel, torpedo, mine, ammunition, fresh water and food depot. Initially, from 1927 onwards, the old Nordsee tender was converted accordingly and replaced by the newly built Tsingtau in 1934. In January 1939, the Tanga was added as a second ship. In 1938 the Navy ordered two more, but considerably larger and faster S-boat escort ships, the Carl Peters and her sister ship Adolf Lüderitz.

The ship was 114 meters long (103.6 m in the waterline) and 14.5 m wide, had a draft of 4.34 m and displaced 2900 tons (standard) and 3600 tons (maximum). Two double-acting MAN four-stroke diesel engines with Vulcan gearbox gave it 12,400 hp and a top speed of 23 knots. The range of action was 12,000 nautical miles at a cruising speed of 15 kn. The ship was armed with four 10.5 cm guns, one 4 cm Bofors flak, six 3.7 cm flak and eight 2 cm flak. The crew numbered 225 men.

== Construction and career ==
The Carl Peters was ordered in 1938 at A.G. Neptune and was laid down in Rostock, was launched on 13 April 1939, and was commissioned on 6 January 1940 under the command of Lieutenant Hinzke, the ship was assigned to the 1st Schnellboot Flotilla, in which the Tsingtau had previously served in this function. As early as April, it took part in the Weser Exercise operation with five boats from the flotilla, where it was involved in the occupation of the Norwegian port city of Bergen as part of Warship Group 3 (Kriegsschiffgruppe 3). On the morning of April 9, Carl Peters was initially hit by a torpedo from the old Norwegian torpedo boat Storm, which did not explode and therefore caused only minor damage. Soon afterwards the unit came under fire from the coastal batteries at Kvarven in the Byfjord. The Carl Peters was hit in the mast, which did not cause any great damage to the ship, but killed and wounded several of the embarked army soldiers through splinters. The light cruiser Königsberg and the artillery training ship Bremse also received hits; Both of them could not return without repairs, and the next day the Königsberg was sunk by British dive bombers in the port of Bergen.

After the occupation of Bergen, the Carl Peters and her flotilla initially stayed in Norway, where the S-boats patrolled the fjords and along the coast. Then the flotilla was transferred to the North Sea and the English Channel. In May 1941, in preparation for the attack on the Soviet Union, it went to the Baltic Sea. In the spring of 1942 the 1st Schnellboot Flotilla was transferred to the Black Sea, and Carl Peters, now under the command of Kapitänleutnant Reuthal, was assigned to the 6th and then the 8th Schnellboot Flotilla.

On 1 September 1943, she joined the speedboat school flotilla.

When the Schnellboot-Lehrdivision was set up in April 1944, Carl Peters came as a support ship to the new 3rd Schnellboot-Schulflotille.

On 10 May 1945, two days after the German surrender, Carl Peters ran into a mine in the Geltinger Bay near Flensburg and sank.
