= Heinrich Vogelsang =

German merchant (1862–1914)

Magistrate of German South West Africa
- In office 9 April 1883 – 12 May 1883
- Preceded by: Position established
- Succeeded by: Adolf Lüderitz

Personal details
- Born: 17 March 1862 Bremen, German Confederation
- Died: 25 May 1914 (aged 52) Bremen, German Empire
- Occupation: Merchant and explorer

Heinrich Vogelsang (Bremen, 17 March 1862 – Bremen, 25 May 1914) was a German merchant and explorer, who led the first expedition of Adolf Lüderitz to Angra Pequena, German South West Africa (today Lüderitz Bay, Namibia) in 1883.

== Biography ==
Vogelsang, son of a wealthy Bremen tobacconist and who had already worked in West and South Africa as well as East Africa, met the Bremen merchant and tobacconist Adolf Lüderitz in 1882 and was hired in his company F. A. E. Lüderitz and sent to Angra Pequena (later Lüderitz Bay) in 1883. Lüderitz wanted to buy land there where they could not only conduct trade but also settle German citizens.

Arriving in Angra Pequena on 9 April 1883, Vogelsang acquired the port on 1 May through a purchase agreement with the Nama–Oorlam Captain Joseph Frederiks II. The contract secured Angra Pequena and the surrounding area within a radius of 5 miles for £100 in gold and 200 rifles with accessories. In a second contract, signed on 25 August, he secured the company a 20 mile deep coastal strip from the Orange River to the 26th parallel south for £500 and 60 rifles; the area became known as Lüderitzland. That area, today part of the Sperrgebiet, was far bigger than Frederiks had thought he was selling. The contract specified its width as "twintig geograph'sche mylen" (20 geographical miles), a term that the tribal chief was not familiar with; one German mile equals 4 arcminutes (7.4 kilometers), whereas the common mile in the territory was the English mile: 1.6 kilometers. Both Lüderitz and the signing witness, Rhenish missionary Johannes Bam, knew that Chief Frederiks had no understanding of geographical miles. He was only concerned about fertile land, and the shore of the Atlantic Ocean had no value to his tribe. When Frederiks finally became aware that the land he had sold comprised almost his entire tribal area, he complained to the Imperial German government, but Imperial Commissioner Gustav Nachtigal died in 1885 on his return voyage to Europe, and the complaint was never delivered. The dodgy contract became known as the "Mile Swindle", and Lüderitz was nicknamed "Lügenfritz" (lie buddy) by his fellow countrymen. In 1887 "even the Colonial Department of the Foreign Office doubted the validity of the treaty".

In 1884, Nachtigal appointed Vogelsang consul of the district of Bethanie and representative of the Imperial German government in the Lüderitz Bay. In this role he concluded so-called protection treaties with some ethnic and tribal groups. While he failed in this with the Herero under Maharero, he was successful with the Rehobothers and others.

Vogelsang's service ended in 1885. He left the country, but returned to German South West Africa in 1888 in the service of the German Colonial Society (Deutsche Kolonialgesellschaft, DKG). He then finally dedicated himself to the tobacco trade in his hometown of Bremen.

Fort Vogelsang, the trading post of the Lüderitz company on what later became Lüderitz Bay, was named after Vogelsang.

On 1 May 1908, 25 years after acquiring land in Africa, Vogelsang was honored by the Senate of Bremen, the local commercial associations and colonial supporters. He is said to have rejected two medals awarded by the Imperial German government with reference to the Hanseatic ban on orders.

== Gallery ==
Contract between Frederiks and Vogelsang dated 25 August 1883, and a map of the sold land

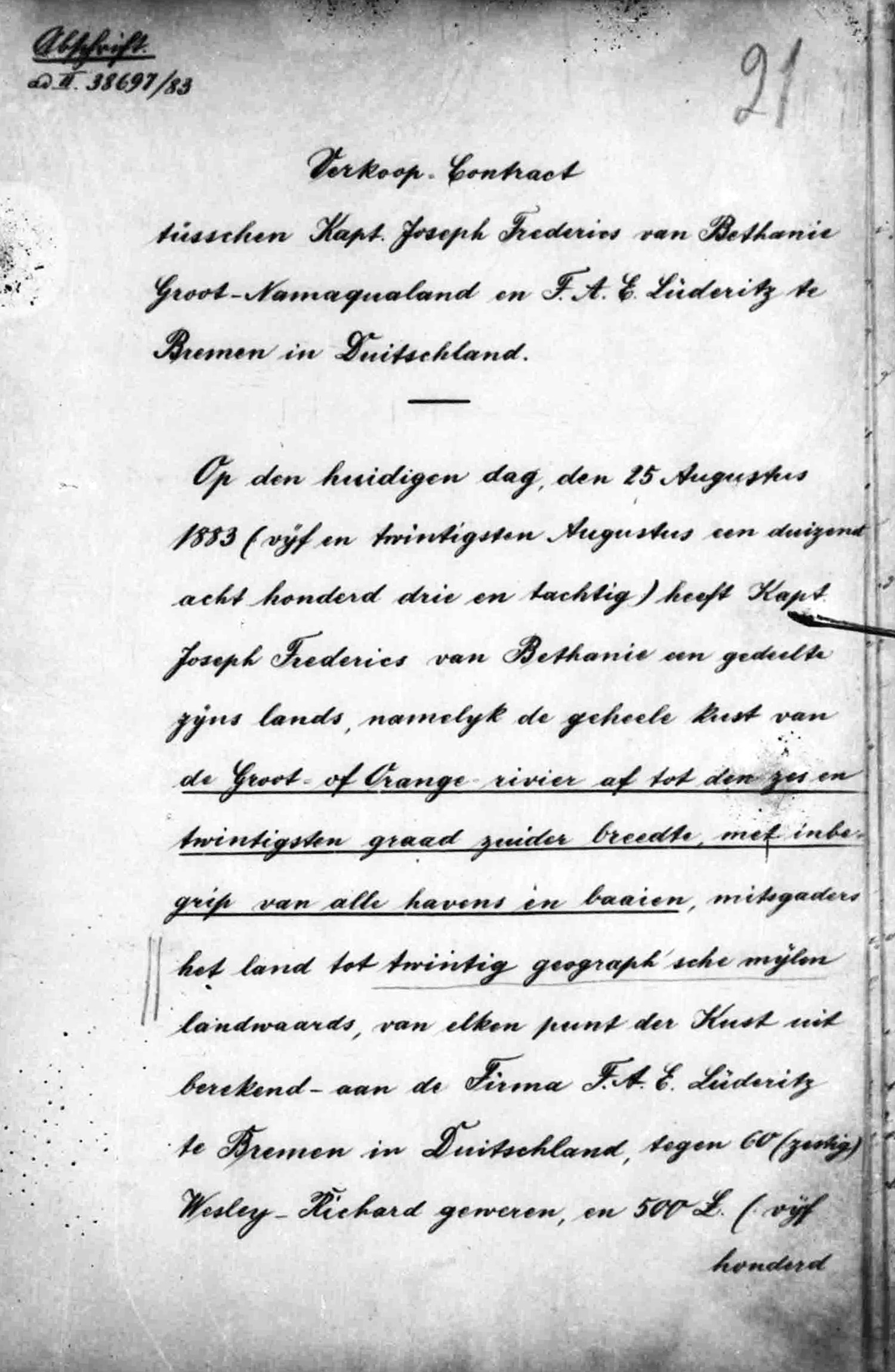
Page 1

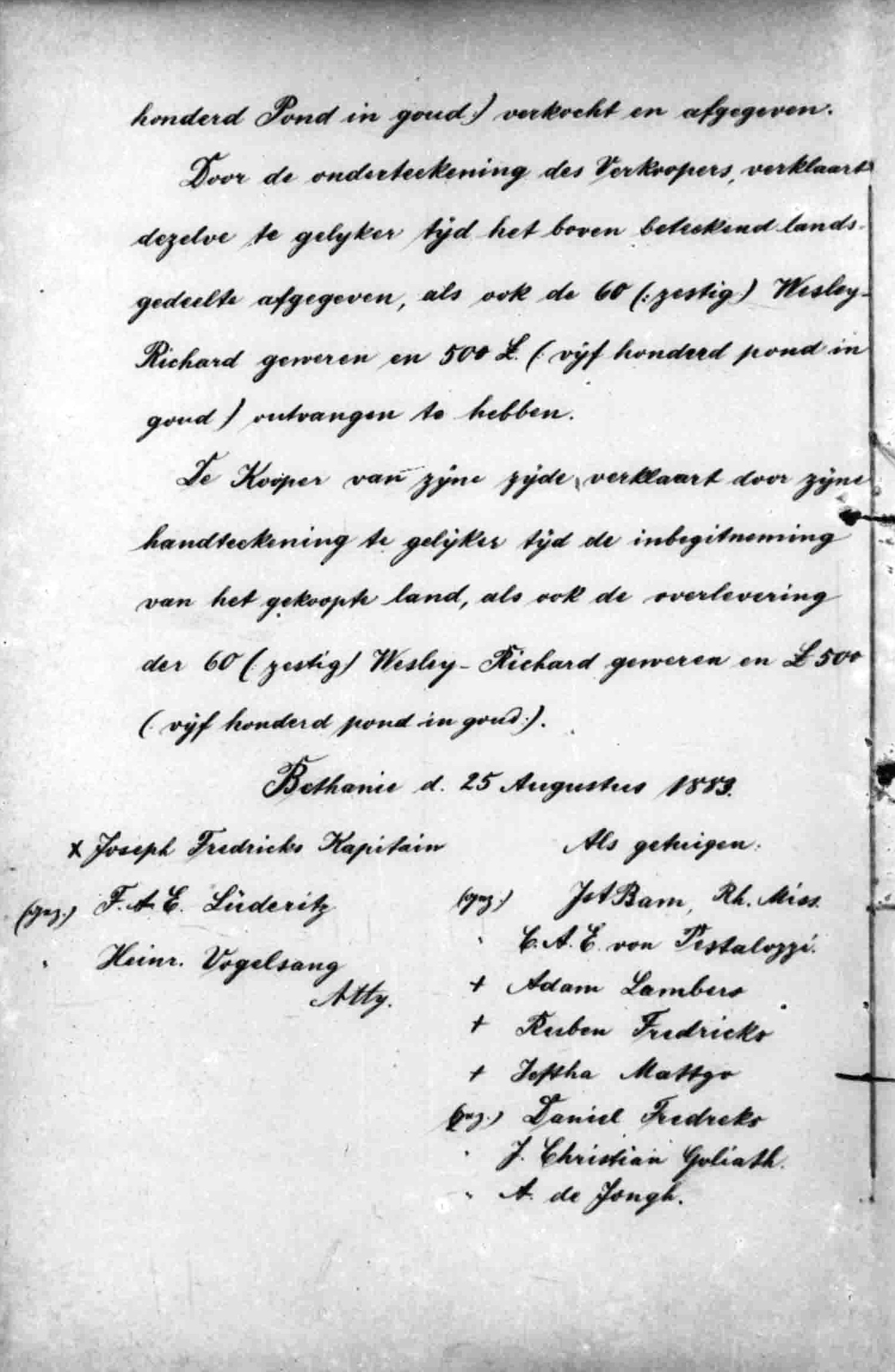
Page 2

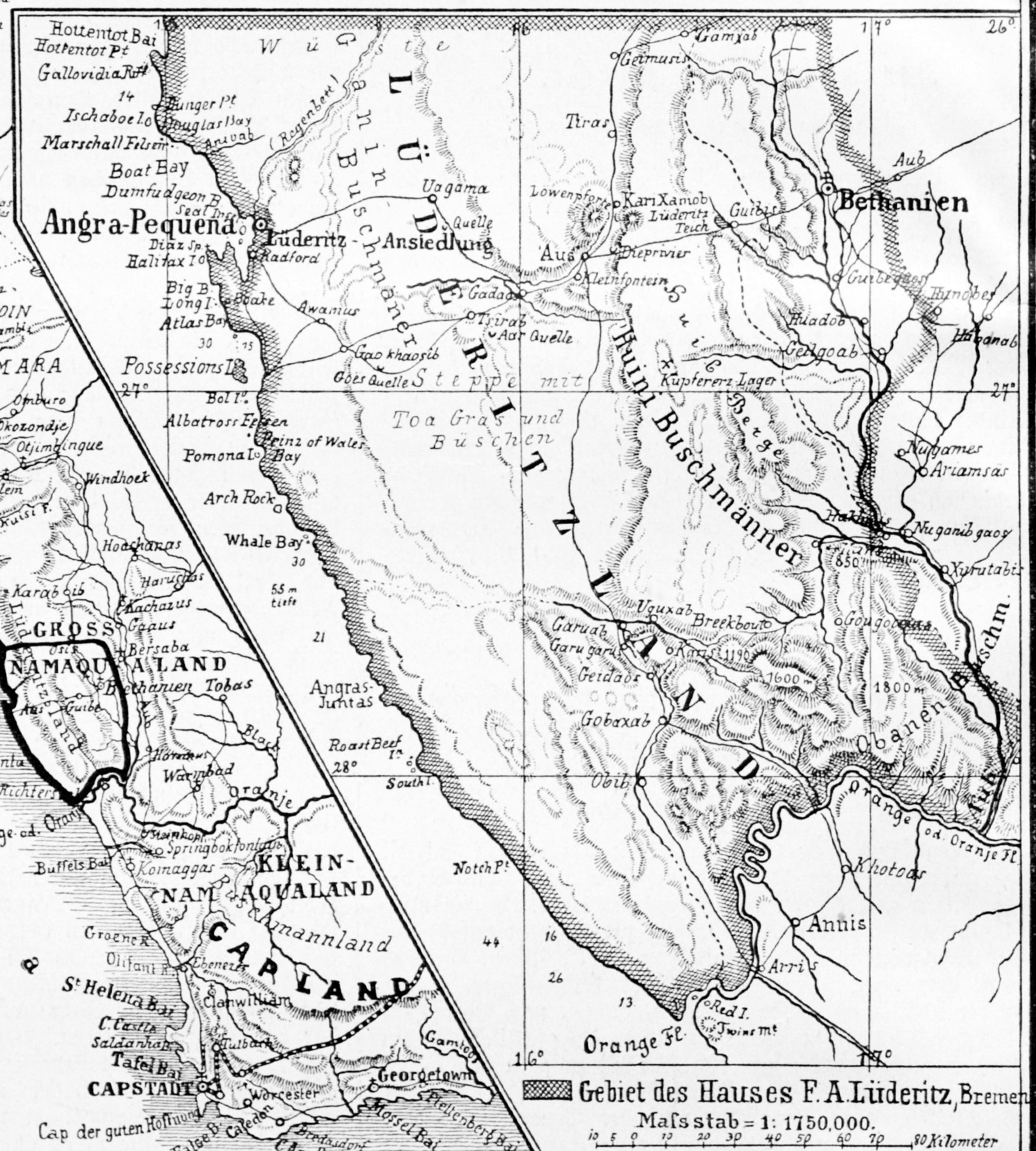
Lüderitzland

== Bibliography ==
- (in German) Conrad Weidmann: Deutsche Männer in Afrika – Lexicon der hervorragendsten deutschen Afrika-Forscher, Missionare etc. Bernhard Nöhring, Lübeck 1894, S. 177.

Government offices
New title	Magistrate of German South West Africa; 1883	Succeeded by Adolf Lüderitz
