= 2009 Lüderitz oil spill =

Coordinates: 26°11′S 14°58′E

The 2009 Lüderitz oil spill began in April 2009 off the coast of Lüderitz, Namibia. The oil spill directly affected 171 African penguins, with many more possibly threatened. The oil spill is in the area where the fishing trawler Meob Bay sank in June 2002, killing 19 seamen. The boat sank after a rope got caught in the propeller, which then detached causing water to flood into the engine room. However, an inspection of the site where the vessel had sunk showed that the wreck was not the source of the oil; the source of the spill could not be found but is thought to be bunker oil that was released by a large vessel passing through Namibian waters. In terms of wildlife affected, it was the largest spill in Namibian history according to local residents of Lüderitz.
