= German fleet tender Adolf Lüderitz =

Fleet tender of Nazi Germany

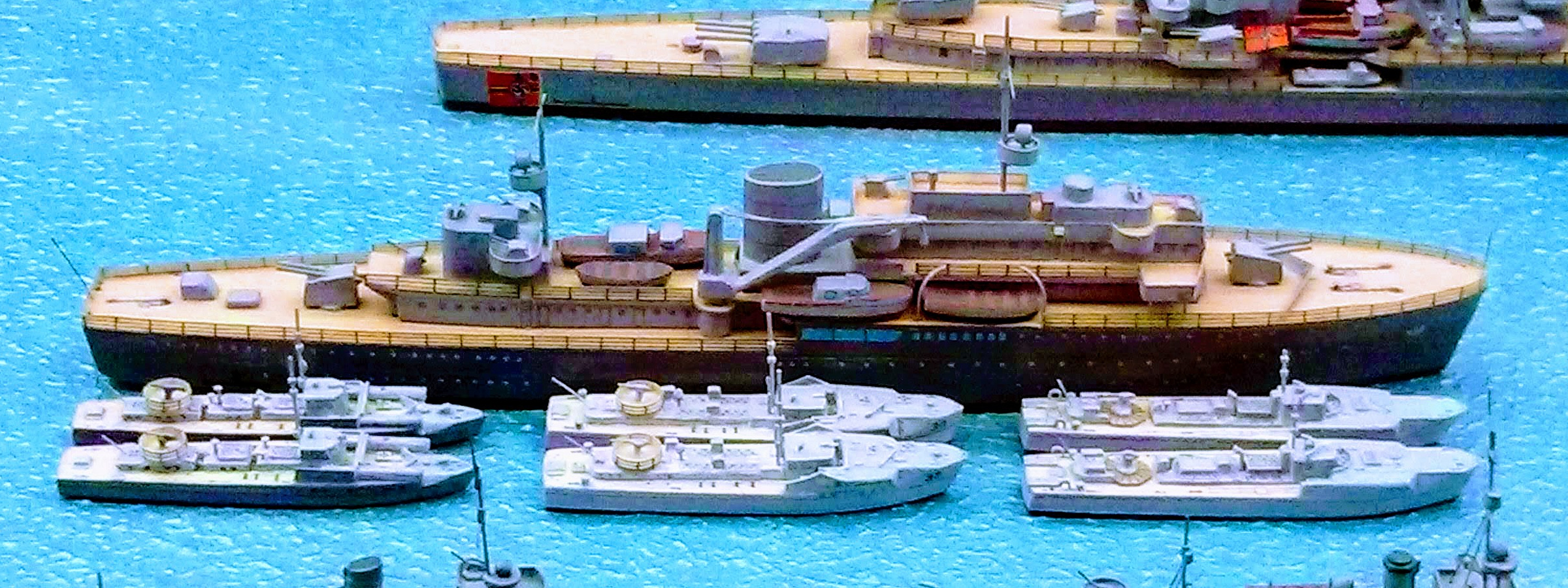
- Model of Adolf Lüderitz

History

Nazi Germany
- Name: Adolf Lüderitz
- Namesake: Adolf Lüderitz
- Ordered: 1938
- Builder: Neptun Werft
- Laid down: 1938
- Launched: 20 February 1939
- Acquired: 11 June 1940
- Commissioned: 11 June 1940
- Fate: Transferred to Soviet Union, 25 December 1945

History

Soviet Union
- Name: Pajserd; (Пайсерд)
- Acquired: 1946
- Commissioned: 1946
- Decommissioned: 1964

General characteristics
- Type: Depot ship
- Displacement: 3,600 tonnes (3,500 long tons) at full load
- Length: 144 m (472 ft 5 in)
- Beam: 14.5 m (47 ft 7 in)
- Draft: 4.34 m (14 ft 3 in)
- Propulsion: 4 × MAN 6-cyl diesel engines; 2 × shafts; 1,240 hp (920 kW)
- Speed: 23 knots (43 km/h)
- Complement: 225 crew
- Armament: 2 × dual 10.5 cm SK L/45 naval guns; 1 × single 4 cm Flak 28; 6 × single 3.7 cm SK C/30s; 8 × 2 cm Flak 30s

The Adolf Lüderitz was a fleet tender of the Kriegsmarine, sometimes also known as an aviso. She was named after the Bremen businessman Adolf Lüderitz (1834–1886), whose land acquisition in 1883 in what is now Namibia led to the establishment of the German protected area German South West Africa the following year.

== Development and design ==
For their growing number of small craft, the Reichsmarine and later the Kriegsmarine needed appropriately equipped escort ships for each flotilla, which served the boat crews as accommodation and the boats as fuel, torpedo, mine, ammunition, fresh water and food depot. Initially, from 1927 onwards, the old Nordsee tender was converted accordingly and replaced by the newly built Tsingtau in 1934. In January 1939, the Tanga was added as a second ship. In 1938 the Navy ordered two more, but considerably larger and faster S-boat escort ships, the Adolf Lüderitz and her sister ship Carl Peters.

The ship was 114 meters long (103.6 m in the waterline) and 14.5 m wide, had a draft of 4.34 m and displaced 2900 tons (standard) and 3600 tons (maximum). Two double-acting MAN four-stroke diesel engines with Vulcan gearbox gave it 12,400 hp and a top speed of 23 knots. The range of action was 12,000 nautical miles at a cruising speed of 15 kn. The ship was armed with four 10.5 cm guns, one 4 cm Bofors flak, six 3.7 cm flak and eight 2 cm flak. The crew numbered 225 men.

== Construction and career ==
The Adolf Lüderitz was ordered in 1938 at A.G. Neptune and was laid down in Rostock, was launched on 20 February 1939, and was commissioned on 11 June 1940 under the command of Kapitänleutnant Möbes as the escort of the 3rd Schnellboot Flotilla.

The area of operation of the 3rd S-Flotilla comprised the sea area from the Netherlands to the English Channel. When the flotilla was relocated to the Mediterranean Sea, the Adolf Lüderitz came in November 1941 under her new commander, Korvettenkapitän d. R. Hans Erasmi, on the newly established 8th speedboat flotilla, which operated in the Kristiansand, Stavanger and Vardø area in Norway. On June 24, 1942, the ship was assigned to the 6th Schnellboot Flotilla and stayed in Norway.

On January 17, 1943, the Adolf Lüderitz was attacked off Ålesund by the Norwegian submarine Uredd, but the torpedoes missed their target. Finally, since November 1943 under Kapitänleutnant Gauland, the ship was assigned to the 1st Schnellboot Flotilla of the Schnellboot Lehrdivision, which was also deployed in Norway.

On April 14, 1945, the ship was damaged by bombs and missiles in an air raid along the Jøssingfjorden. On the day of the German surrender (May 8, 1945), the ship was in Stavanger, where it fell into British hands.

After the war, the Adolf Lüderitz was initially used in the German mine clearance service as an escort ship of the 4th mine clearance division in Kristiansand (German naval service in Norway). In 1946 the ship was delivered as spoils of war to the Soviet Union, in whose navy it served under the name Pajserd until at least 1964. It is possible that she is still surviving as a hulk to this day.
