= Naval Calling Station Luderitz =

Namibian naval station

- Near Luderitz in Namibia

Site information
- Type: Naval Station
- Owner: Ministry of Defence (Namibia)
- Operator: Namibian Navy
- Controlled by: Namibian Defence Force
- Condition: Active

Location
- Coordinates: 26.6591°S 15.1611°E

Garrison information
- Current commander: Commander

Naval Calling Station Luderitz is a naval station of the Namibian Navy. It is located in Luderitz on Namibia South Atlantic coast. The station was commissioned in 2007 and Commander Cristoph Moshoeshoe appointed as the first commandant.

== Current status ==
The station is currently active. Non of the Namibian Navy's fleet is homeported there currently. The station only serves the fleet as a refurbishment station.

== Commandants ==
Naval Calling Station Luderitz
| From | Commandant | To | Ribbon |
|---|---|---|---|
| 21 June 2019 | Commander Natangwe Hekandjo | Incumbent | |
| 22 June 2016 | Simiranü Elia Ndiyaamena | 21 June 2019 | |
| unknown date | Commander Armas Iigonda | Unknown date | |
| unknown date | Commander Theofilus Simon | Unknown date | |
| 2007 | Commander Kristoph Moshoeshoe | Unknown date | |
