= Lüderitz Reformed Church =

The Lüderitz Reformed Church is a congregation of the Reformed Churches in South Africa (GKSA) in southern Namibia. Services are held in three locations, Lüderitz, Aus, and Rosh Pinah.

The congregation was founded on 7 December 1949, spun off of the Bethanie Reformed Church (NGK). Located in one of the driest points of the world, it had a very far-flung membership. Its area included the diamond-crusted Sperrgebiet and included around 15 coastal islands. The capital of the congregation is Lüderitz. Members included karakul farmers, miners, guano harvesters, factory workers, sergeants, railwaymen, and others. The 550 members were so widespread by 1952 that visiting 15 households on the outskirts could entail a 1,400-km journey. At the time, services were also held in Aus, 130 km from the coast, and in Oranjemund, around 300 km from Lüderitz. Oranjemund seceded in 1959, and in 2013 would join the Western and Southern Cape Synod, after which it joined the Namibian Synod.

Eighteen months after the foundation of the congregation the first church in Lüderitz was dedicated on 10 June 1950. The congregation's first pastor was the Rev. P.A.M. Brink, previously with the Bethanie mother church.

== Select pastors ==
1. Philippus Albertus Myburgh Brink, 1950 - 1955
2. Dirk Johannes Malan, 1955 - 1958
3. Albertus Johannes de Bruyn, 1959 - 1961
4. Pierré Herman Bosman, February 18, 1982 - 1985 (then in Keetmanshoop-North)

== Sources ==
- Phil Olivier (compiler). 1952. Ons gemeentelike feesalbum. Cape Town/Pretoria: N.G. Kerk-Uitgewers.
- Official information from the Dutch Reformed Church in Namibia.
