= Joseph Frederiks II =

Captain of the ǃAman (d. 1896)

Captain of the ǃAman
- Reign: 1880 – 20 October 1893
- Predecessor: David Christian Frederiks
- Successor: Paul Frederiks
- Died: 20 October 1893; Bethanie, German South West Africa

Joseph Frederiks II (Khoekhoe: ǃKhorebeb-ǁNaixab; died 20 October 1893) was a Captain or chieftain of the ǃAman (Bethanie Orlam), a subtribe of the Orlam. He became Captain when his uncle and stepfather David Christian Frederiks was killed in 1880 in the Battle of Otjikango.

Frederiks was party to a land sale deal between the Bethanie Orlam and German merchant Adolf Lüderitz that would eventually establish Imperial Germany's colony of German South-West Africa. Lüderitz in May 1883 obtained the area of Angra Pequena (today the town of Lüderitz) from Frederiks for 100£ in gold and 200 rifles. Three months later on 25 August, Frederiks sold Lüderitz a stretch of land 140 kilometres (87 mi) wide, between the Orange River and Angra Pequena, for £500 and 60 rifles.

The contract between Fredericks and Lüderitz, and a map of the sold land

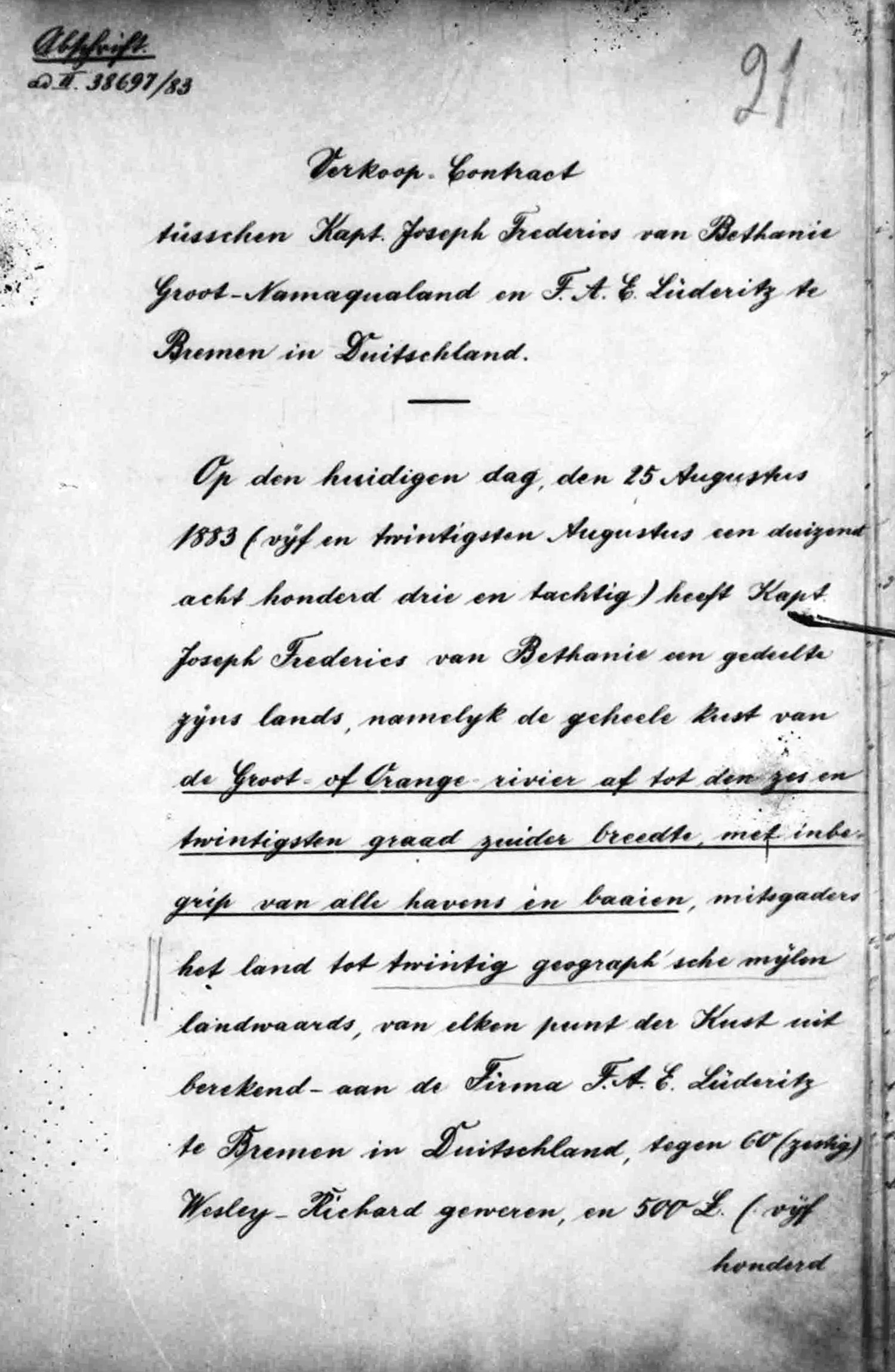
Contract page 1

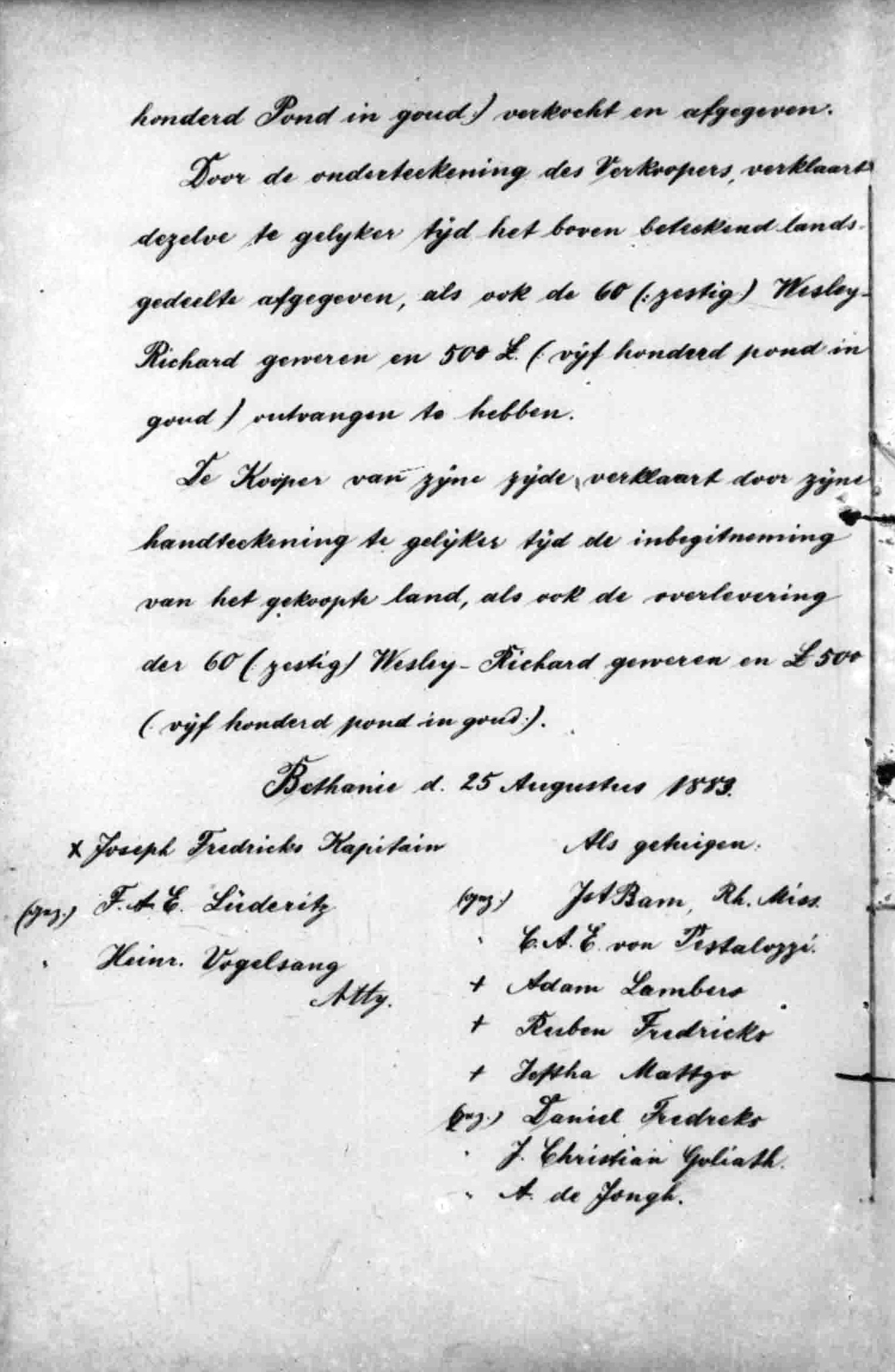
Contract page 2

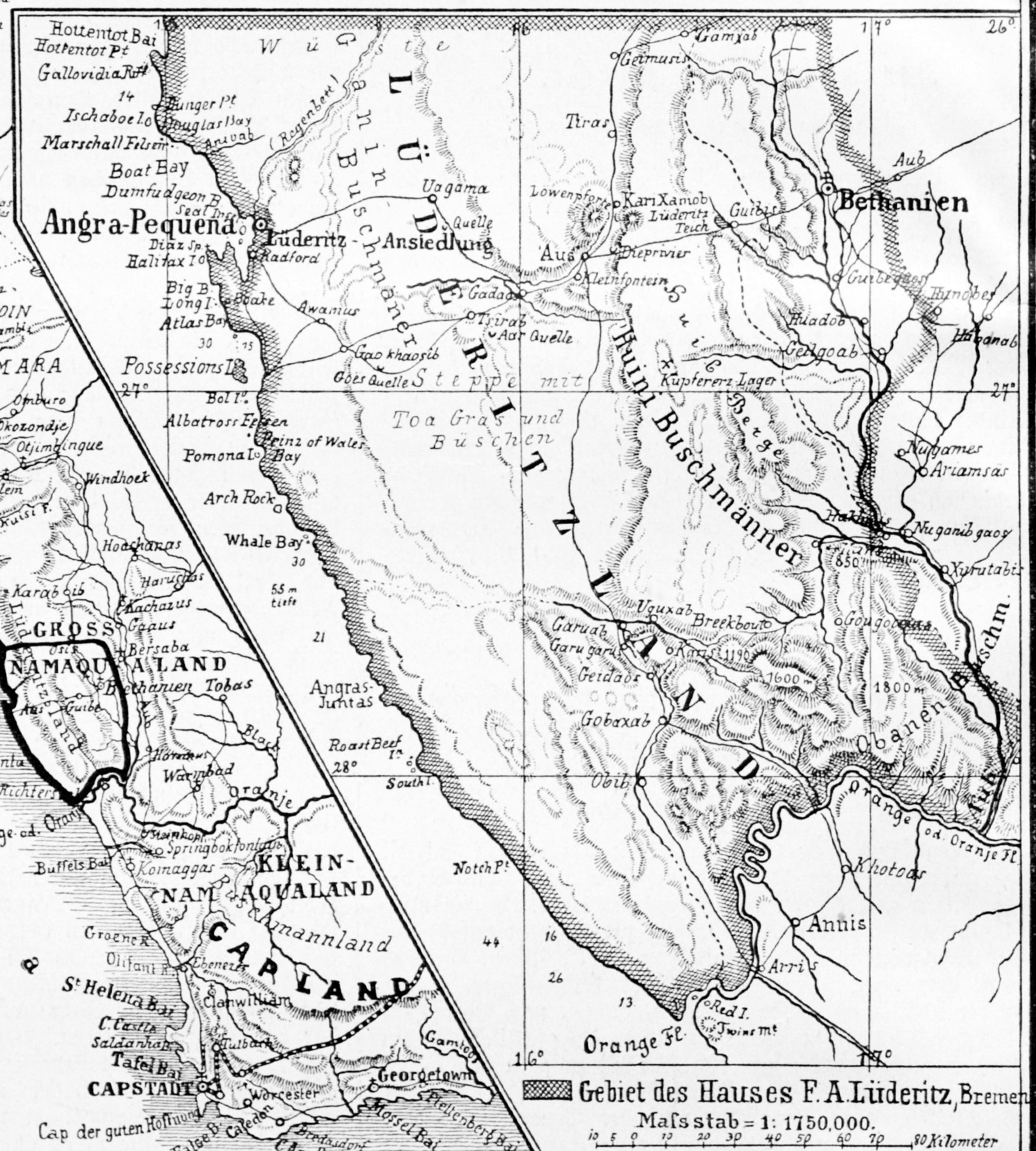
Lüderitzland

This area, for a short period called Lüderitzland and today part of the Sperrgebiet, was far bigger than Frederiks had thought, as the contract specified its width as "20 geographical miles", a term that the tribal chief was not familiar with: 1 German geographical mile equals 7.4 kilometres (4.6 mi), whereas the common mile in the territory was the English mile, 1.6 kilometres. Both Lüderitz and the signing witness, Rhenish missionary Johannes Bam, knew that Chief Frederiks had no idea about geographical miles. He was only concerned about fertile land, and the shore of the Atlantic Ocean was of no value to his tribe. When Frederiks finally became aware of the size of the land he sold, he submitted a complaint to the German Imperial Government, but Consul-General Gustav Nachtigal died on his return voyage, and the complaint was never delivered. In 1887 "even the Colonial Department of the Foreign Office doubted the validity of the treaty".

In the wake of the land deal, Frederiks on 28 October 1884 also signed a protection treaty with the German Empire, the second of its kind in German South West Africa, after the treaty with the Rehoboth Basters two weeks prior. He died on 20 October 1893 in his home village Bethanie, and Paul Frederiks succeeded him as Chief of the ǃAman.
