= German fleet tender Tanga =

Fleet tender of Nazi Germany

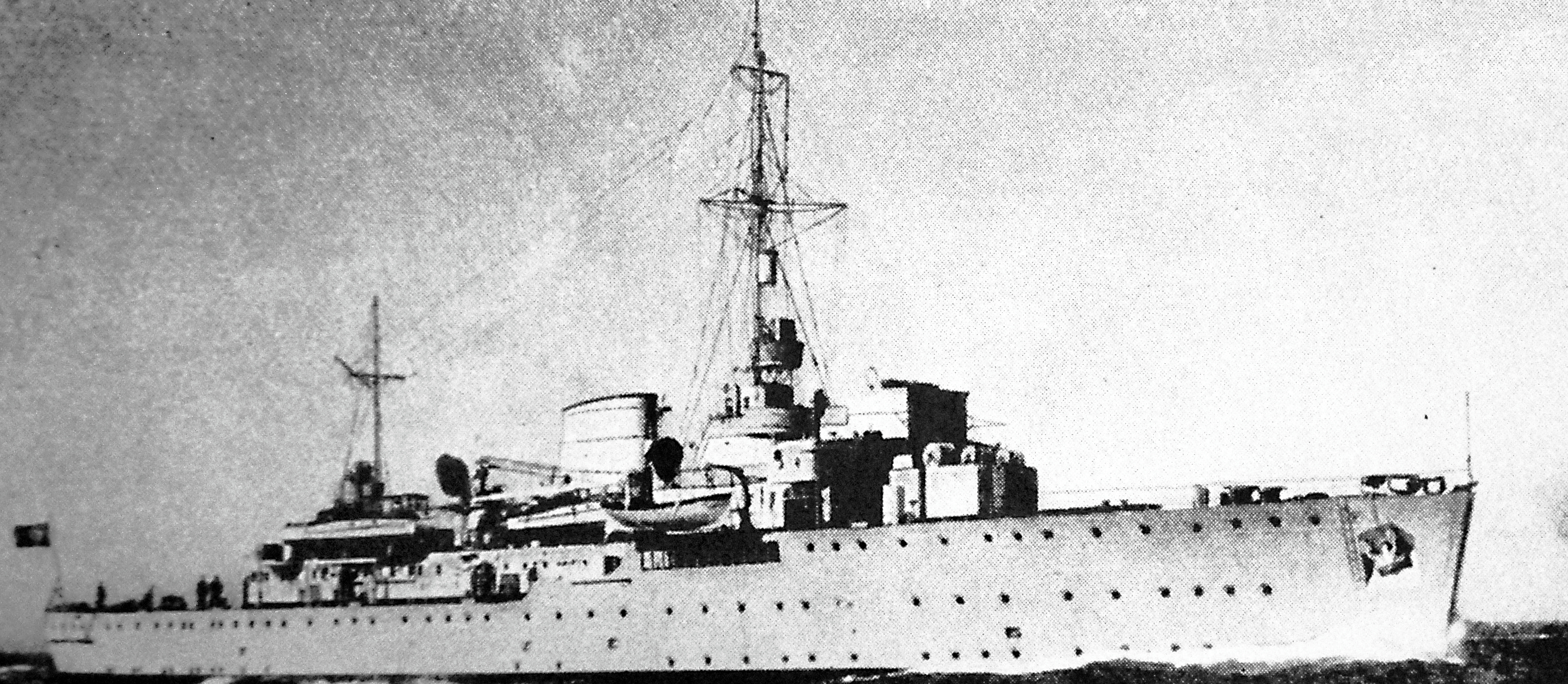
- Tanga at sea, 1939

History

Nazi Germany
- Name: Tanga
- Namesake: Tanga, Tanzania
- Builder: Neptun Werft
- Launched: 4 December 1937
- Commissioned: 21 January 1939
- Fate: Scrapped, 1967

General characteristics
- Type: Depot ship
- Displacement: 2,620 tonnes (2,580 long tons) at full load
- Length: 96.2 m (315 ft 7 in)
- Beam: 13.63 m (44 ft 9 in)
- Draft: 4.34 m (14 ft 3 in)
- Propulsion: 2 × MAN four-stroke diesel engines; 2 × shafts; 4,100 hp (3,100 kW) each
- Speed: 27.5 knots (50.9 km/h)
- Complement: 225 crew
- Armament: 2 × single 10.5 cm SK L/45 naval guns; 2 × single 3.7 cm SK C/30s; 4 × 2 cm Flak 30s

Tanga was a fleet tender serving the Kriegsmarine. The second ship of this type in the navy, which served as accommodation for the crews of the Schnellboote and as a fuel, ammunition, fresh water and food depot for them.

== Construction and technical data ==
The ship was originally commissioned by AG Neptun in Rostock as Qi Jiguang for the Republic of China Navy and was launched there on 4 December 1937. In 1938, the Kriegsmarine bought the unfinished ship and had it completed as a fleet tender. On 12 December 1938, the ship was named Tanga, after the port city of Tanga in the former colony of German East Africa and the Battle of Tanga fought there in November 1914. The ship was commissioned on 21 January 1939, being assigned to the 2nd Schnellboot Flotilla.

The ship was 96.2 meters (315 ft 7 in) long, 13.63 m (44 ft 9 in) wide and had a draft of 4.14 m (13 ft 7 in). Her displacement was 2,190 tons and 2,620 tons at maximum load. Two MAN four-stroke diesel engines, each creating 4,100 horsepower (3,100 kW) and with Vulcan transmitters, enabled a top speed of 17.5 knots (32.4 km/h; 20.1 mph). The radius of action was 8,450 nautical miles (15,650 km; 9,720 mi) at 9 knots (17 km/h; 10 mph) cruising speed or 5,000 nmi (9,300 km; 5,800 mi) at 15 knots (28 km/h; 17 mph) cruising speed. The armament consisted of two 10.5 cm SK L/45 guns, two 3.7 cm SK C/30 anti-aircraft guns and four 2 cm Flak 30 anti-aircraft guns. The crew numbered 225 men.

== Operational history ==
At the beginning of the war in 1939, the 2nd Schnellboot-Flotille under Kapitänleutnant Rudolf Petersen, later Kommodore and commander of the Schnellboote, with Tanga (under Kapitänleutnant Reinhold Bening) and boats S-9, S-10, S-14, S-15, S-6 and S-17 were in the port of Heligoland. From here, the flotilla was to undertake a reconnaissance mission on 4 September 1939, but the operation had to be canceled due to heavy weather. The boat S-17 suffered such severe damage that it was declared a total loss.

On 10 September, the flotilla moved to Kiel, then to Swinemünde, Sassnitz, Rostock and back to Kiel. Above all, training was carried out, for instance firing torpedoes off Schlemmünde. In addition, the flotilla provided anti-submarine protection for the heavy cruisers Admiral Hipper and Blücher and searched in vain for Polish submarines trying to break out of occupied areas in the western Baltic Sea, the Great and Little Belts and in the Öresund. With the onset of the icing of the Baltic Sea, the flotilla moved back to the North Sea.

On 1 March 1940, the Tanga was assigned to the newly established 6th Schnellboot Flotilla, which was first used in the southern North Sea and then during the German western offensive in the English Channel. On 15 October 1941, the ship was made available to the new Admiral Nordmeer, Vice Admiral Hubert Schmundt, and then in November, together with the 8th Destroyer Flotilla, moved to Kirkenes in northern Norway. There, the Tanga served as Admiral Schmundt's staff ship until May 1942. After that she was assigned to the S-Boot-Schulverband in the Baltic Sea, where she remained until the end of the war.

=== Post-war service ===
After the end of the war, the Tanga was used by the German Mine Sweeping Administration from 10 May 1945, before being decommissioned on 3 December 1947, and confiscated as an American war trophy.

On 8 June 1948, the ship was sold to Denmark, where she was put into service after refitting at Copenhagen on 12 December 1951, and served as a tender, command ship and training ship in the Danish Navy under the name Ægir and the registration number A560.

The ship now displaced 2,379 tons and was armed until 1957 with two 12.7 cm Rheinmetall guns, six Bofors 40 mm automatic cannons and two 37 mm guns. After conversion and rearmament from October 1956 to February 1958, the main armament consisted of two British 10.2 cm rapid-fire guns. There were also two depth charge launchers. The two 37 mm guns and one of the original six 40 mm autocannons were removed in 1956 and 1963 respectively. The ship could carry up to 24 torpedoes for submarines. The crew consisted of 44 officers and 183 enlisted men and (as a training ship) up to 122 trainees.

The Ægir served mostly in home waters, but made a voyage to Canada in 1958 and one to the Mediterranean Sea in 1961. In September 1964 she served as the flagship of the Royal Danish Flotilla sailing to Greece to celebrate the marriage of the Greek King Constantine II to the Danish Princess Anne-Marie. After that, she was officially reclassified as a training ship.

The ship was decommissioned on 10 January 1967, sold to Paul Bergsøe & Son in Jernhaven on the island of Masnedø for scrapping on 20 July 1967, and scrapped in the same year.
