= Adolf Lüderitz =

German colonial merchant (1834–1886)

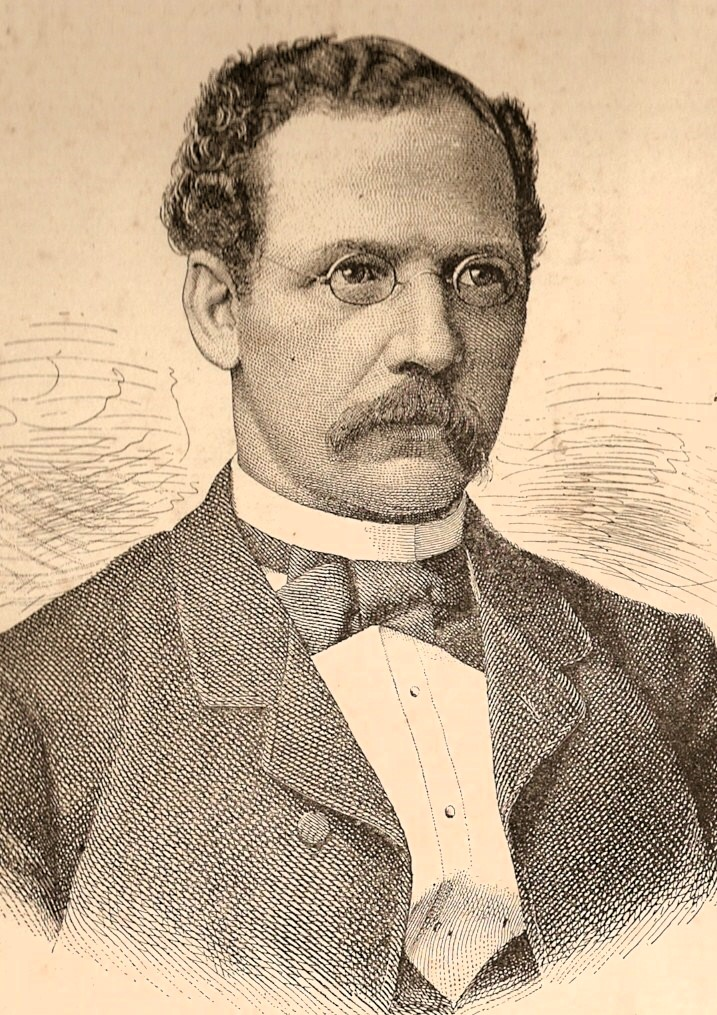
F.A.E. Lüderitz (around 1885)

Franz Adolf Eduard Lüderitz (16 July 1834 – end of October 1886) was a German merchant and the founder of German South West Africa, Imperial Germany's first colony. The coastal town of Lüderitz, located in the ǁKaras Region of southern Namibia, is named after him.

== Early life ==
Lüderitz was born on 16 July 1834 in the German city-state of Bremen to tobacco merchant Adolf Lüderitz and his wife Wilhelmine. He had one younger brother who later became his assistant. After graduating from school, Lüderitz attended the Handelsschule (Merchant's Gymnasium) in Bremen and then worked as an intern in his father's business.

Between 1854 and 1859, he travelled among tobacco bourses in North America. He took up a position in Mexico, but the trader soon went bankrupt. He then bought a tobacco farm himself which was destroyed shortly thereafter in the turmoil of the Reform War. Bankrupt, he returned to Germany in 1859 and joined his father's business. His 1866 marriage to the wealthy Bermen native Emilie Louise (born 1836) made him financially independent. Three children were born to them. When Lüderitz's father died in 1878 he took over the tobacco business.

== South West Africa ==
In 1881 Lüderitz established a factory at Lagos in British West Africa, but this enterprise also proved unsuccessful. Still interested in setting foot in Africa, he and fellow Bremen merchant Heinrich Vogelsang (1862-1914) decided to found a German colony in South West Africa, then still unclaimed by any colonial power. They intended to offer an alternative to German settlers, who at that time were leaving their motherland in droves for North America, where they were no longer under German influence.

In May 1883, Lüderitz bought the anchorage at Angra Pequena and the land eight kilometres (five miles) around it from Captain Josef Frederiks II of Bethanie, a tribal chief, for £100 in gold and 200 rifles. Three months later, on 25 August, Frederiks sold Lüderitz a stretch of land 140 kilometres (87 mi) wide, between the Orange River and Angra Pequena, for £500 and 60 rifles. Lüderitz named the sum of all his South West African land-acquisitions Lüderitzland.

The contract between Fredericks and Lüderitz, and a map of the sold land

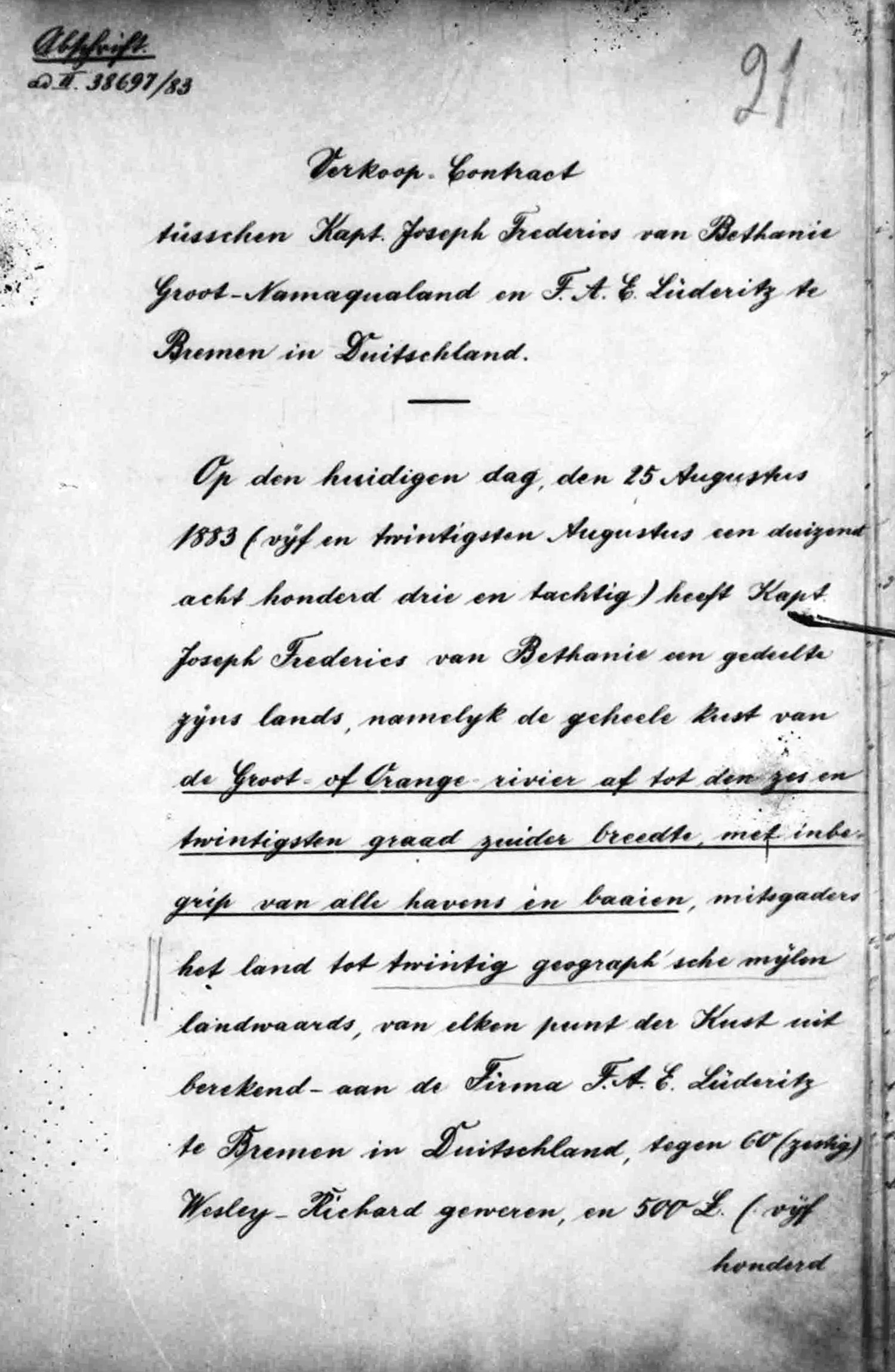
Contract page 1

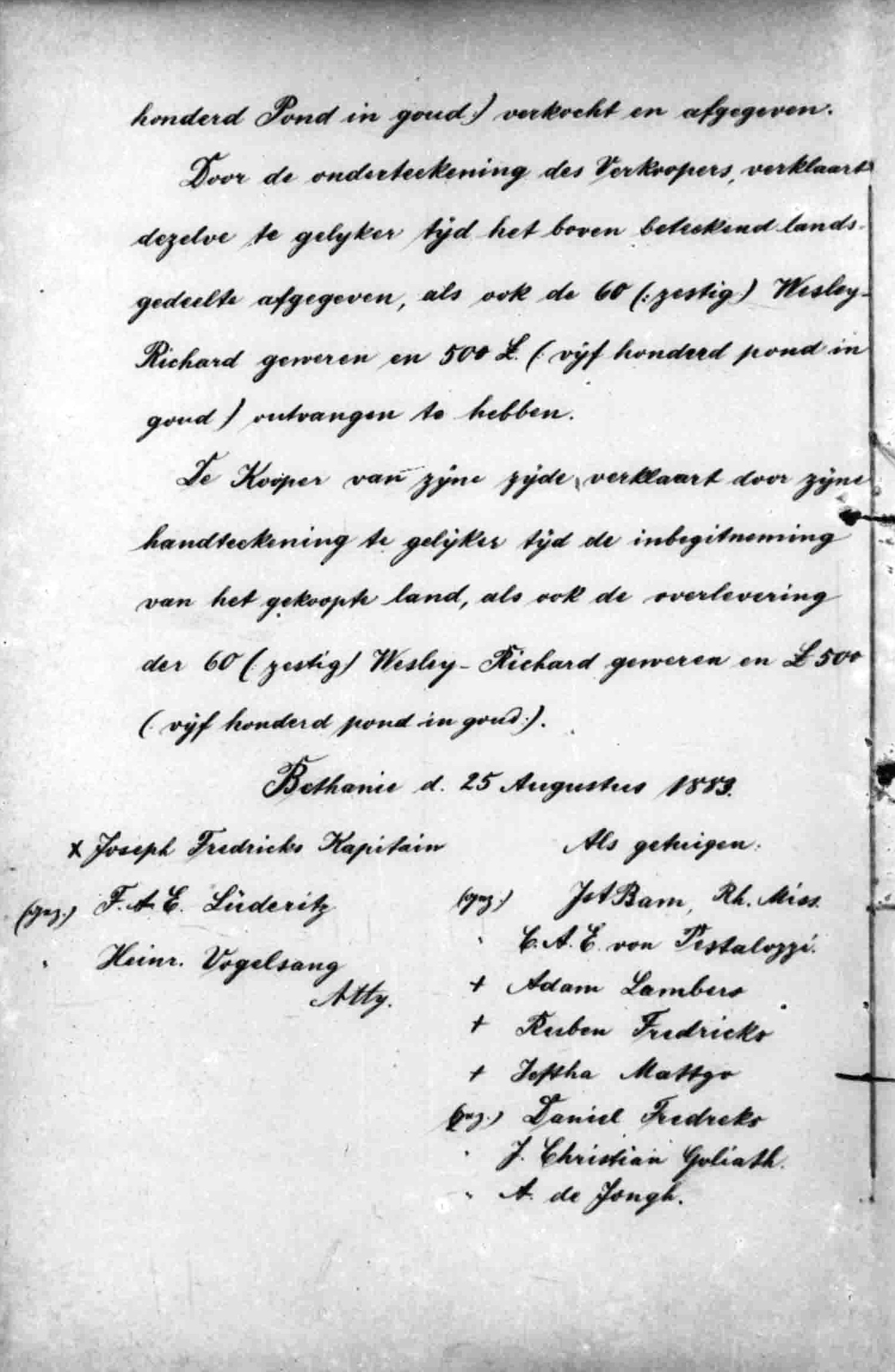
Contract page 2

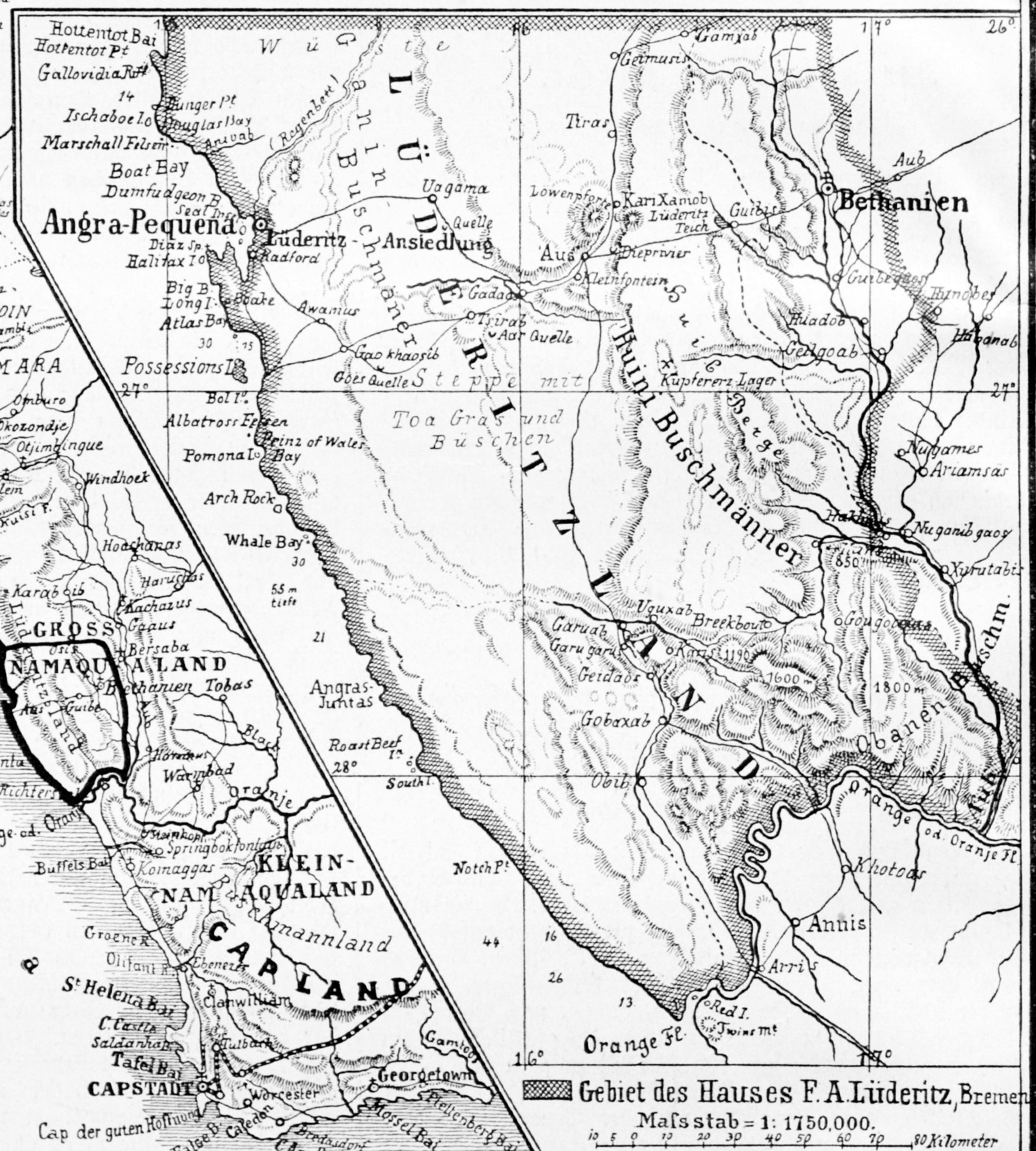
Lüderitzland

Lüderitzland, today part of the Sperrgebiet, was far bigger than Frederiks had thought. The contract specified its width as "twintig geograph'sche mylen" (20 geographical miles), a term that the tribal chief was not familiar with; one German geographical mile equals 4 arcminutes (7.4 kilometers), whereas the common mile in the territory was the English mile: 1.6 kilometers. Both Lüderitz and the signing witness, Rhenish missionary Johannes Bam, knew that Chief Frederiks had no understanding of geographical miles. He was only concerned about fertile land, and the shore of the Atlantic Ocean had no value to his tribe. When Frederiks finally became aware that the land he had sold comprised almost his entire tribal area, he submitted a complaint to the German Imperial Government, but Consul-General Gustav Nachtigal died (1885) on his return voyage to Europe, and the complaint was never delivered. The dodgy contract became known as the "Mile Swindle", and Adolf Lüderitz was nicknamed "Lügenfritz" (lie buddy) by his fellow countrymen. In 1887 "even the Colonial Department of the Foreign Office doubted the validity of the treaty".

Imperial Germany's Foreign Office at first hesitated to grant official protection to Lüderitz's acquisitions, fearing immense costs and the military vulnerability of an empire spread across several continents. When economic considerations became more favourable, and in preparation for the 1884 German federal election, Chancellor Otto von Bismarck changed his mind and from then on repeatedly asked London about Britain's intentions in South West Africa, where London already owned Walvis Bay and several islands in the Atlantic Ocean, including some in the immediate vicinity of Angra Pequena. There was considerable doubt whether a German colony would be politically acceptable to Britain. Bismarck received no answer.

Only when Lord Derby, British Secretary of State for the Colonies (in office: 1882-1885) ordered the Cape Colony administration to take possession of the South West African coast did Bismarck agree to declare German Schutzgebiete (protection areas); the term 'colonies' was not used for diplomatic reasons. On 7 August 1884, German South West Africa was officially declared by hoisting the German flag in Lüderitzbucht.

From then on, Lüderitz commissioned several expeditions into the vast hinterland. He bought land from other chiefs until he owned the entire coastal strip from South Africa to Angola, an area totalling 580,000 square kilometres (220,000 sq mi), and he sent mining engineers to search for exploitable mineral deposits. This endeavour depleted his funds completely, and he found neither gold nor diamonds. In April 1885 he had to sell his enterprise to the German Colonial Society for 500,000ℳ.

== Death and legacy ==
Desperate to find a source of income from his vast land acquisitions, Lüderitz planned another expedition to the Orange River in 1886. This time he took part himself, and set off in July with three others. They transported two small boats via Aus and Bethanie to Nabasdrift, close to the conjunction of the Fish and Orange Rivers, and continued downstream towards the Atlantic Ocean. The boat in which Lüderitz travelled was never found; their last reported overnight stay was on 21/22 October.

After Lüderitz's death the German Colonial Society renamed the bay of Angra Pequena Lüderitzbucht to remember the initiator of German claims to the South West African territory. The town developing around the harbour was called Lüderitz. In 2013 Namibia's president Hifikepunye Pohamba stated that "I have accepted the [4th Delimitation] Commission's recommendation that Lüderitz Constituency be renamed ǃNamiǂNûs Constituency which was the original name of the area. This includes the current town of Lüderitz". Arguments flared up over whether or not this implied a name change of the town of Lüderitz to ǃNamiǂNûs. The current interpretation of the statement is that only the constituency has been renamed. The capital Windhoek still has a street named Lüderitzstrasse with no current plans of renaming it. A plaque commemorating Adolf Lüderitz is situated on Shark Island in the bay of Lüderitz.

In Germany, several streets are named after Adolf Lüderitz, although repeated calls to rename them have been made, for instance in Bremen, Cologne, Munich, and Berlin. In April 2018, Berlin decided to change the name of the street in Wedding.

There was further a Kriegsmarine fleet tender carrying his name, and a 1934 Reichspost stamp.
