= Lüderitz =

- Town
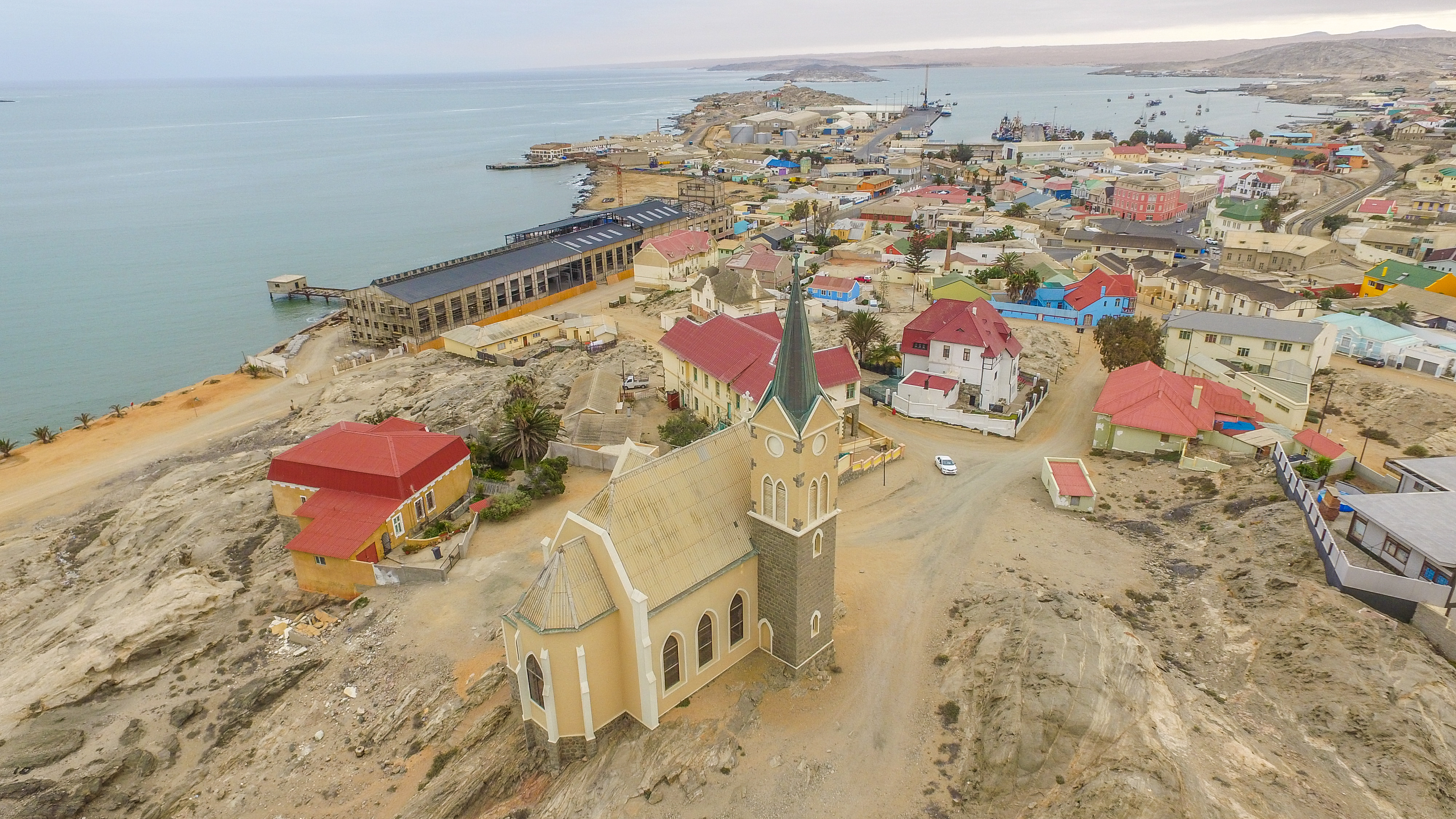
- An aerial view of Lüderitz with the Felsenkirche in the foreground and the rest of the town in the background

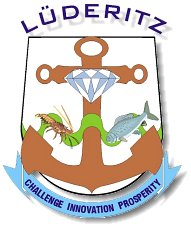
- Coat of arms
- Motto(s): Challenge, Innovation, Prosperity
- Interactive map of Lüderitz
- Location in Namibia Lüderitz (Africa)
- Coordinates: 26°38′45″S 015°09′14″E
- Country: Namibia
- Region: ǁKaras Region
- Constituency: ǃNamiǂNûs Constituency
- Established: 1883

Government
  - Mayor: Brigitte Ingrid Fredericks (SWAPO)
  - Deputy Mayor: Josephine Heita (SWAPO)

Area
  - Total: 5.5 sq mi (14.2 km^{2})

Population (2023)
  - Total: 16,125
  - Density: 2,940/sq mi (1,140/km^{2})
- Time zone: UTC+2 (SAST)
- Climate: BWk
- Website: luderitz-tc.com

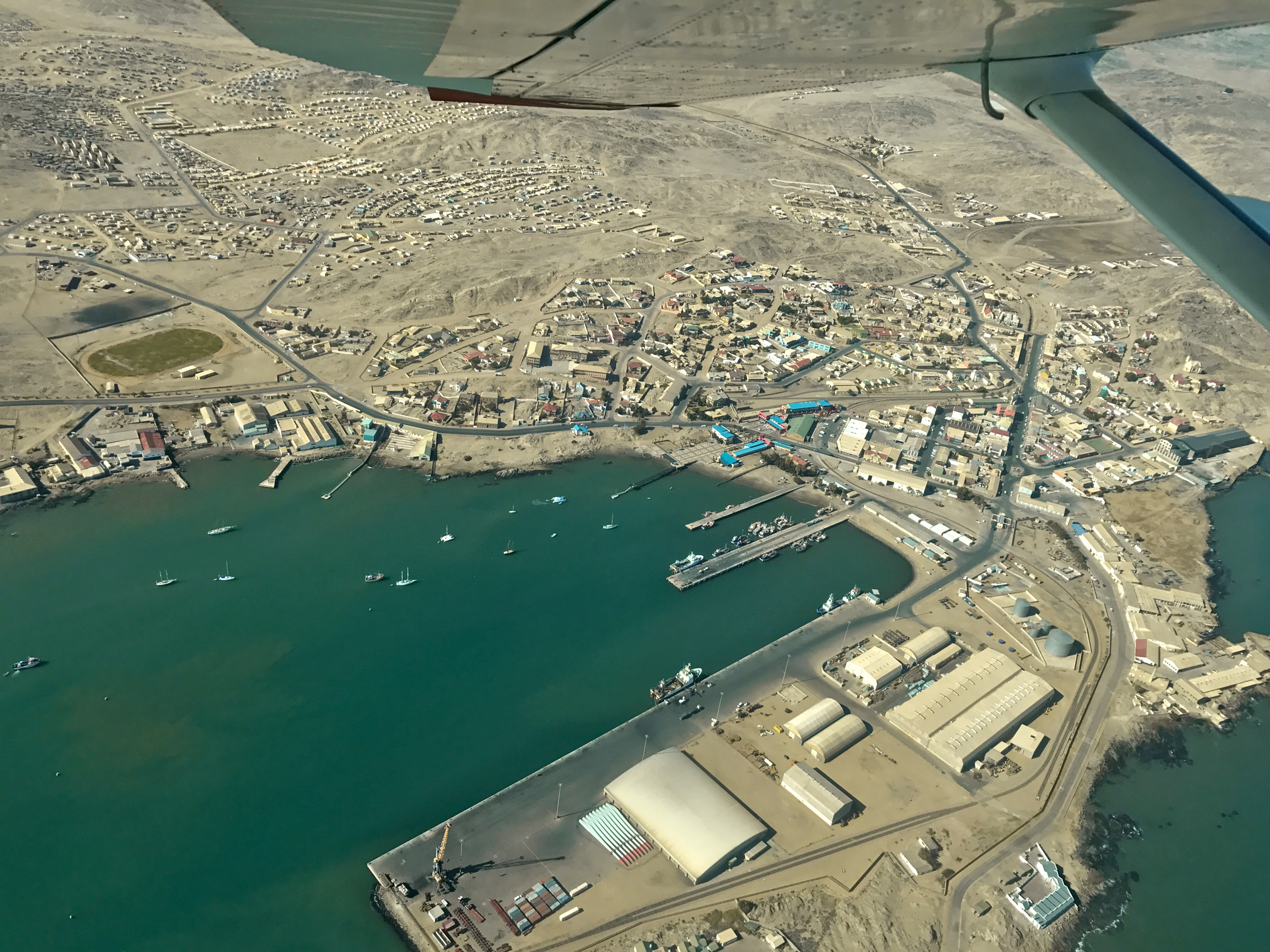
Bird's eye view of Lüderitz (May 2017)

Lüderitz is a town in the ǁKaras Region of southern Namibia. It lies on one of the least hospitable coasts in Africa. It is a port developed around Robert Harbour and Shark Island. Lüderitz had a population of 16,125 people in 2023.

The town is known for its colonial architecture, including some Art Nouveau work, and wildlife, including seals, penguins, flamingos, and ostriches. It is also home to a museum and lies at the end of a currently decommissioned railway line to Keetmanshoop. The town is named after Adolf Lüderitz, founder of the German South West Africa colony.

== Economy and infrastructure ==
The centre of Lüderitz's economic activity is the port, until the incorporation of the Walvis Bay exclave in 1994, the only suitable harbour on Namibia's coast. However, the harbour at Lüderitz has a comparatively shallow rock bottom, making it unusable for many modern ships. The recent addition of a new quay has allowed larger fishing vessels to dock at Lüderitz. The town has also re-styled itself in an attempt to lure tourists to the area, which includes a new waterfront area for shops and offices.

The German magazine Der Spiegel reports that a massive green hydrogen project is taking shape 80 kilometres south of Lüderitz, in Tsau ǁKhaeb Sperrgebiet National Park. For the operation of one of the five largest hydrogen plants in the world, 500 wind turbines and 40 square kilometres of solar panels are to be constructed. The green hydrogen will be piped to Lüderitz, where a desalination plant and an ammonia production facility are planned. The total investment will roughly equal Namibia's entire gross domestic product.

Lüderitz is situated on the B4 national road to Keetmanshoop. It is also the terminus of the 318 kilometres (198 mi) railway line to Seeheim, where the railway connects to the rest of the country's network. This line, built by inmates of the concentration camp on Shark Island, was completed in 1908 but is currently not operational. Rebuilding of the remaining 47 kilometres (29 mi) track gap to Aus has been delayed since 2009.

The town very early had a power plant, used to power the electrified railway lines that served the diamond mining industry in Kolmanskop, Pomona, Bogenfels (completed 1913), and Charlottental (completed 1920). With 1.5 megawatts (2,000 hp) of output, it is assumed to be the largest in Africa at that time.

== History ==
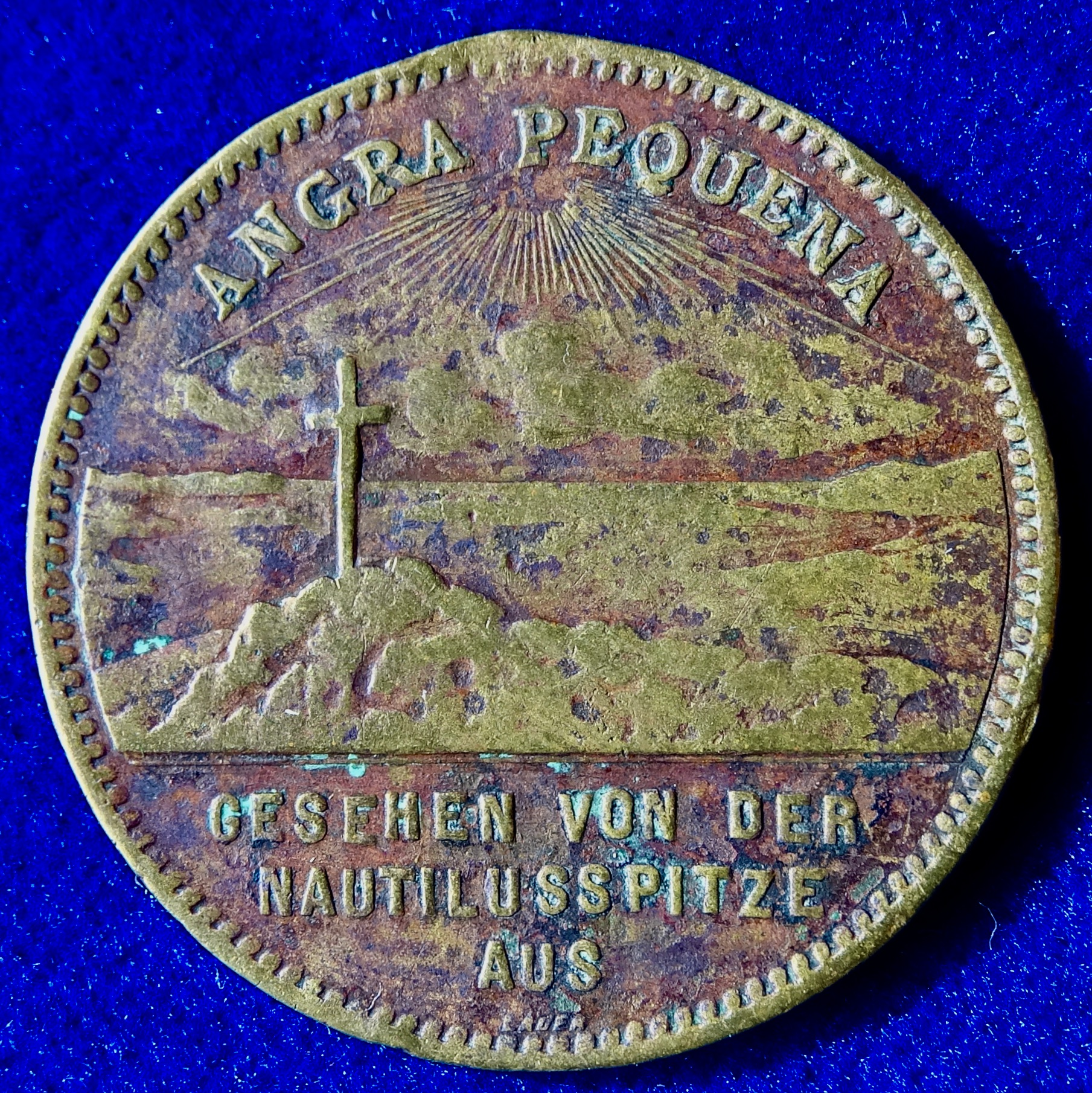
Angra Pequena View from Nautilus Point, German Medal 1884, obverse

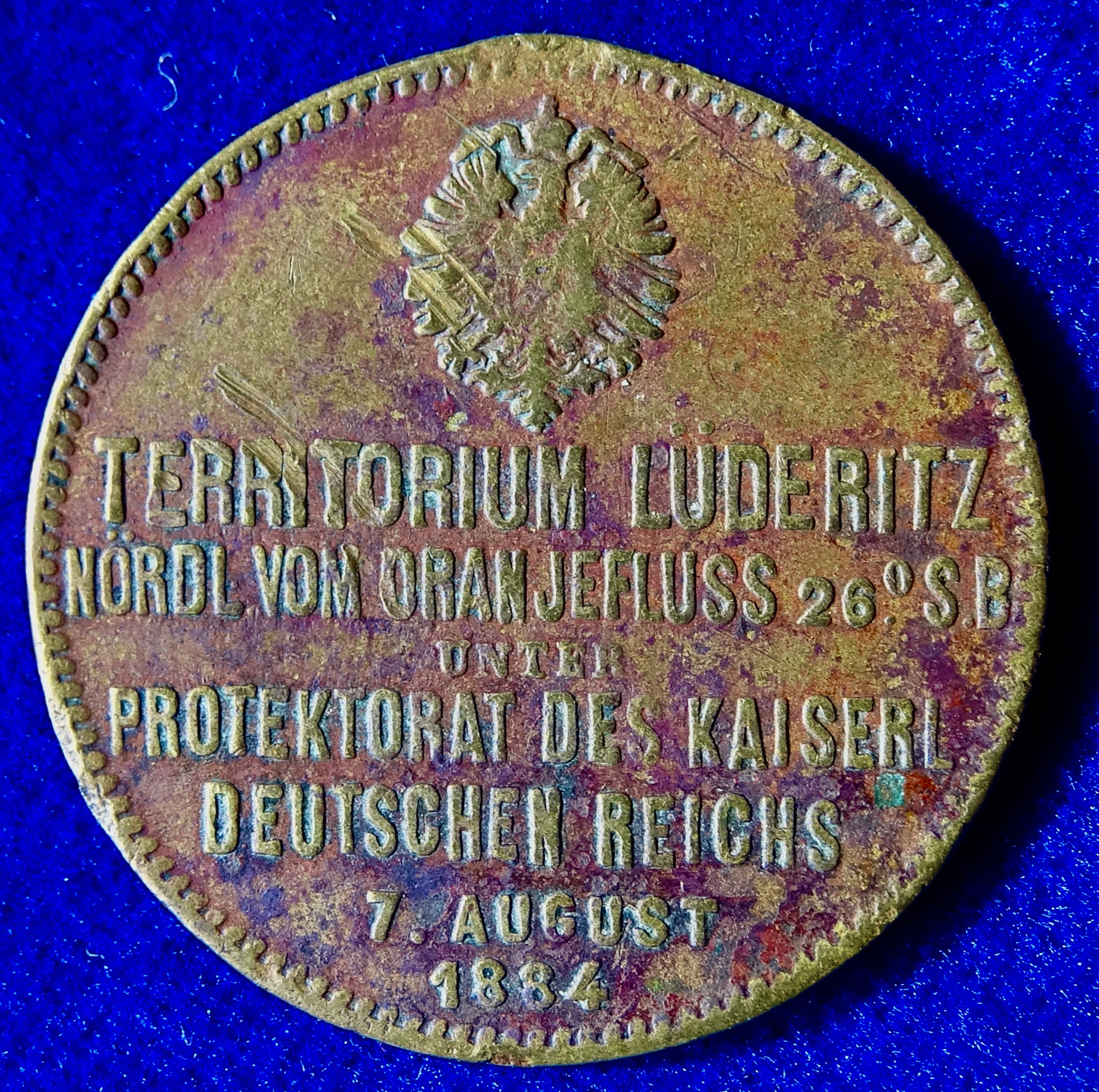
German Protectorate Medal Lüderitz Territory 7 August 1884, reverse.

The bay on which Lüderitz is situated was first known to Europeans when Bartolomeu Dias encountered it in 1487. He named the bay Angra Pequena (Portuguese: Small Bay) and erected a padrão (stone cross) on the southern peninsula. In the 18th century, Dutch adventurers and scientists explored the area in search of minerals, but did not have much success. Further exploration expeditions followed in the early 19th century, during which the vast wildlife in the ocean was discovered. Profitable enterprises were set up, including whaling, seal hunting, fishing, and guano harvesting. Lüderitz thus began its life as a trading post.

The town was founded in 1883 when Heinrich Vogelsang purchased Angra Pequena and some of the surrounding land on behalf of Adolf Lüderitz, a Hanseatic from Bremen in Germany, from the local Nama chief Josef Frederiks II in Bethanie. On 7 August 1884, the German Flag was officially hoisted in Angra Pequena. When Adolf Lüderitz did not return from an expedition to the Orange River in 1886, Angra Pequena was named Lüderitzbucht in his honour. The later shortening of the town's name to Lüderitz also refers to him. In 1905, German authorities established a concentration camp on Shark Island. The camp, access to which was very restricted, operated between 1905 and 1907 during the Herero Wars. Between 1,000 and 3,000 Africans from the Herero and Nama tribes died here as a result of the tragic conditions of forced labour. Their labour was used for the expansion of the city, railway, port, and on the farms of white settlers.

In 1909, after the discovery of diamonds nearby, Lüderitz enjoyed a sudden surge of prosperity due to the development of a diamond rush to the area. In 1912, Lüderitz already had 1,100 inhabitants, not counting the indigenous population. Although situated in a harsh environment between desert and Ocean, trade in the harbour town surged, and the adjacent diamond mining settlement of Kolmanskop was built.

After the German World War I capitulation, South Africa took over the administration of German South West Africa in 1915. Many Germans were deported from Lüderitz, contributing to its shrinking population numbers. From 1920 onwards, diamond mining was only conducted further south of the town in places like Pomona and Elizabeth Bay. This development consequently led to the loss of Lüderitz's importance as a trading place. Only small fishing enterprises, minimal dock activity, and a few carpet weavers remained.

To remove colonial names from the maps of Namibia, on 8 August 2013, the Namibian government renamed the constituency ǃNamiǂNûs, its name before 1884.

== Geography ==
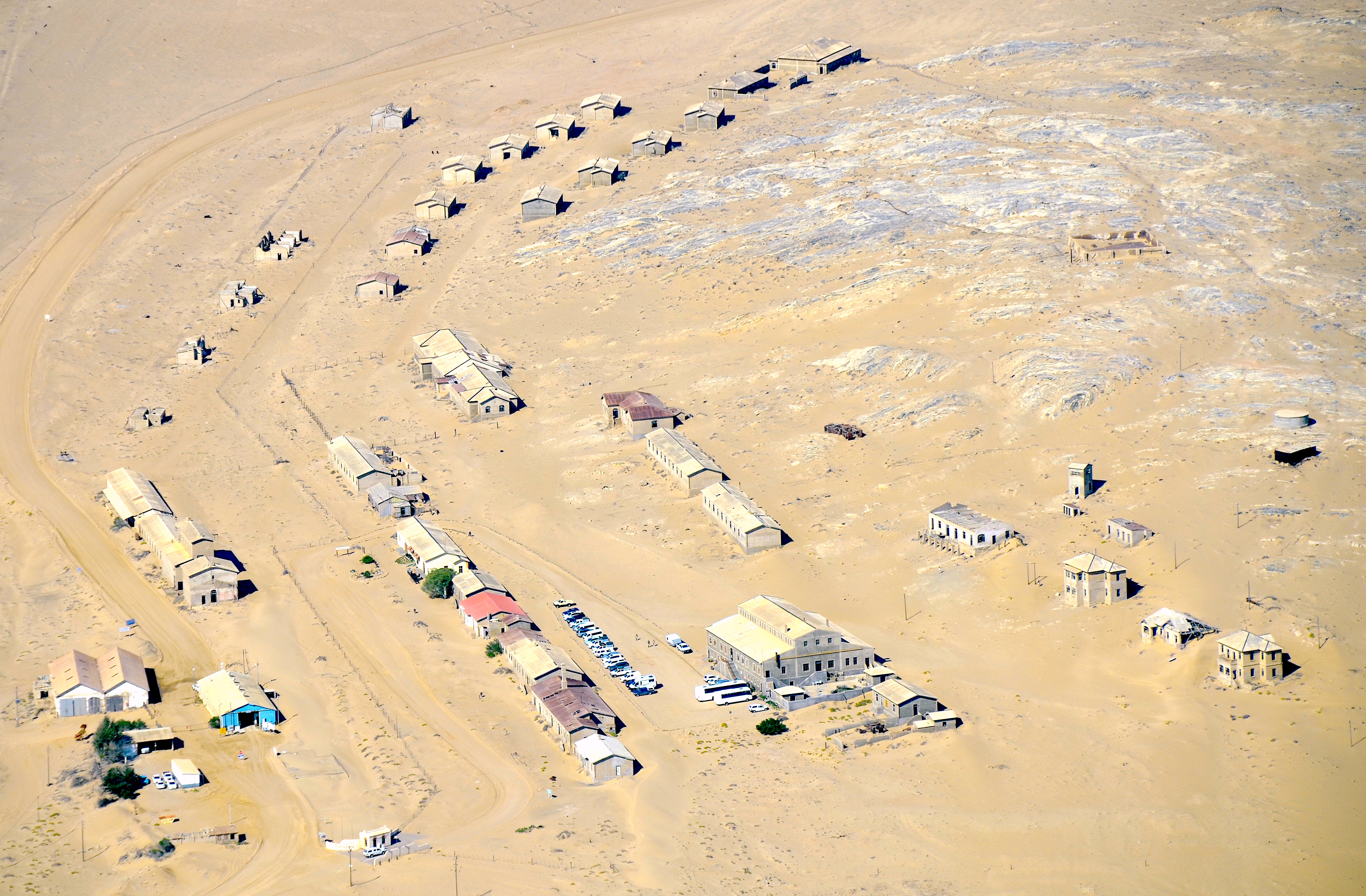
Ghost town Kolmanskop (2017)

Just outside Lüderitz lies the ghost town of Kolmanskop, a prominent tourist destination in the Namib Desert. This previously bustling diamond town is now abandoned and fights a constant struggle against being buried under the shifting dunes of the desert.

Historical population
Year	Pop.	±% p.a.
2001	13,295	—
2011	12,537	−0.59%
2023	16,125	+2.12%

=== Conservation ===
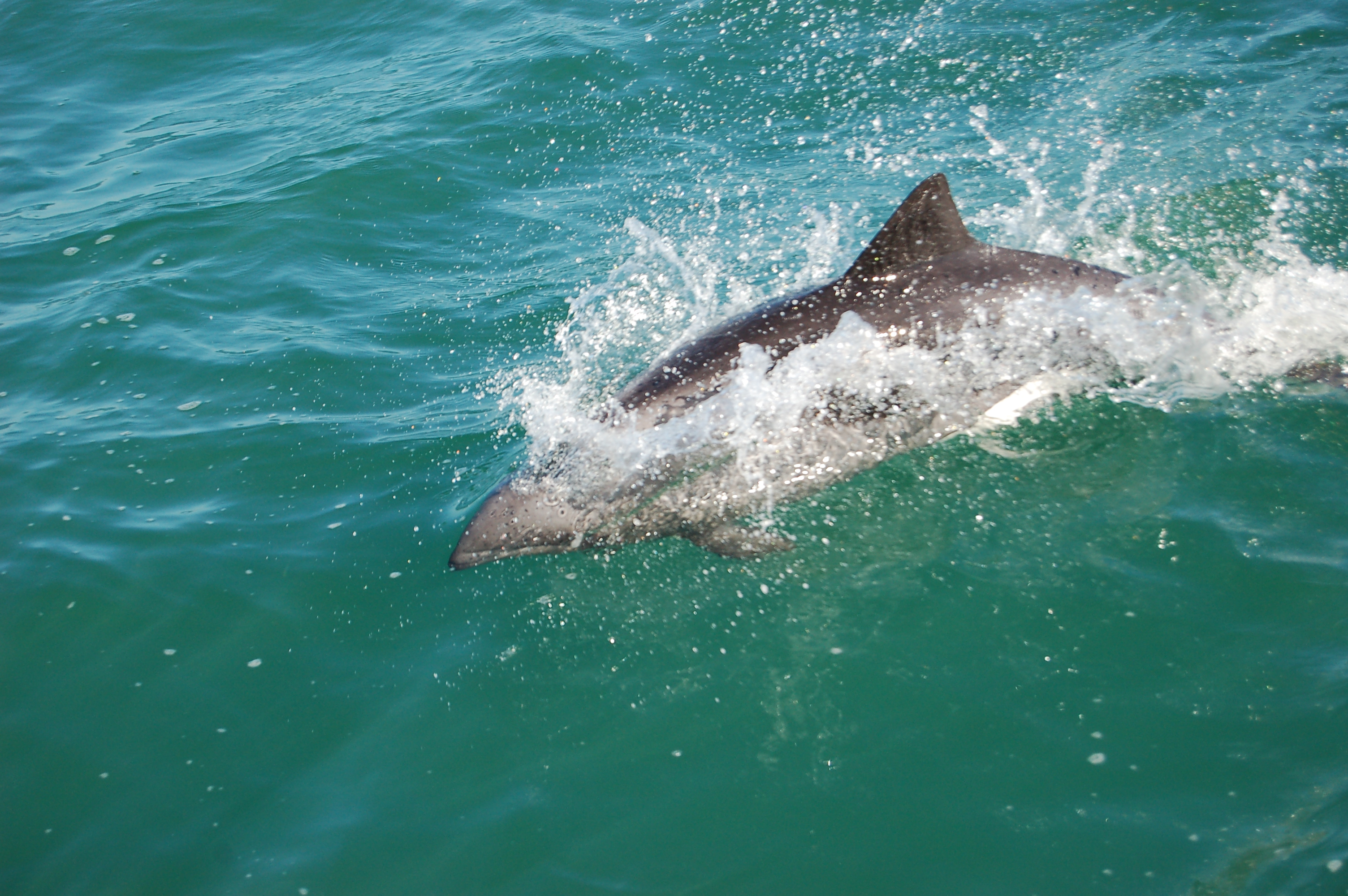
Heaviside's dolphin off Lüderitz.

The coastline of the area is recognised by Bird Life and other global conservation groups as being an Important Bird Area (IBA), i.e., vital for coastal seabird breeding.

In April 2009, an oil spill from an oil tanker risked the safety of countless African penguins and numerous other species of endemic flora and fauna.

Several species of cetacean, notably the diminutive Heaviside's dolphin, can be seen closer to shore; larger whales such as southern right, humpback, minke, fin, and pygmy right are found in pelagic zones further from the mainland.

=== Climate ===
Lüderitz has a cold desert climate (BWk, according to the Köppen climate classification), with cool to mild temperatures throughout the year and very little precipitation; average annual rainfall is just 17 millimetres (0.67 inches). Windy, overcast and cold conditions can occur due to the cold South Atlantic current on the coast.

Climate data for Lüderitz
Month	Jan	Feb	Mar	Apr	May	Jun	Jul	Aug	Sep	Oct	Nov	Dec	Year
Record high °C (°F)	32.5 (90.5)	30.0 (86.0)	34.1 (93.4)	36.5 (97.7)	33.0 (91.4)	31.6 (88.9)	30.7 (87.3)	33.0 (91.4)	35.1 (95.2)	35.0 (95.0)	37.5 (99.5)	30.6 (87.1)	37.5 (99.5)
Mean daily maximum °C (°F)	21.4 (70.5)	21.3 (70.3)	21.1 (70.0)	19.9 (67.8)	19.2 (66.6)	19.0 (66.2)	17.9 (64.2)	17.2 (63.0)	17.3 (63.1)	18.0 (64.4)	19.2 (66.6)	20.5 (68.9)	19.3 (66.7)
Daily mean °C (°F)	17.7 (63.9)	17.8 (64.0)	17.4 (63.3)	16.3 (61.3)	15.5 (59.9)	15.1 (59.2)	14.1 (57.4)	13.7 (56.7)	13.9 (57.0)	14.7 (58.5)	15.8 (60.4)	17.0 (62.6)	15.7 (60.3)
Mean daily minimum °C (°F)	14.0 (57.2)	14.3 (57.7)	13.8 (56.8)	12.6 (54.7)	11.7 (53.1)	11.2 (52.2)	10.4 (50.7)	10.2 (50.4)	10.5 (50.9)	11.4 (52.5)	12.3 (54.1)	13.5 (56.3)	12.1 (53.8)
Record low °C (°F)	5.5 (41.9)	5.0 (41.0)	6.0 (42.8)	5.5 (41.9)	3.3 (37.9)	0.2 (32.4)	3.0 (37.4)	4.8 (40.6)	3.4 (38.1)	3.4 (38.1)	4.9 (40.8)	3.9 (39.0)	0.2 (32.4)
Average precipitation mm (inches)	0 (0)	1 (0.0)	2 (0.1)	2 (0.1)	3 (0.1)	3 (0.1)	1 (0.0)	2 (0.1)	1 (0.0)	0 (0)	0 (0)	0 (0)	17 (0.7)
Average precipitation days (≥ 0.1 mm)	1.0	1.0	1.0	0.9	1.4	1.4	1.0	0.7	0.5	0.5	0.5	0.7	10.6
Average relative humidity (%)	82	81	82	80	79	72	74	78	80	80	80	80	79
Mean monthly sunshine hours	198.4	203.4	257.3	216.0	213.9	144.0	170.5	201.5	216.0	201.5	189.0	176.7	2,388.2
Mean daily sunshine hours	6.4	7.2	8.3	7.2	6.9	4.8	5.5	6.5	7.2	6.5	6.3	5.7	6.5
Source: Deutscher Wetterdienst

== Politics ==
Lüderitz is governed by a town council that has seven seats.

The first local election run after Namibian independence, the 1992 local elections, was won by SWAPO which obtained 2,626 votes and gained six seats. The Democratic Turnhalle Alliance (DTA) obtained the remaining seats with 659 votes. The 1998 local authority elections saw a similar result. SWAPO won and gained six seats (1,322 votes), the DTA obtained the remaining seat with 336 votes.

The 2015 local authority election was again won by SWAPO, which gained six seats (2,679 votes). The remaining seat went to the DTA with 265 votes. SWAPO also won the 2020 local authority election but lost majority control over the town council. SWAPO obtained 1,244 votes and gained three seats. Independent Patriots for Change (IPC), an opposition party formed in August 2020, gained 990 votes and two seats. One seat each went to the Landless People's Movement (LPM, a new party registered in 2018) with 515 votes and the Popular Democratic Movement (PDM, the new name of the DTA since 2017) with 343 votes.

Lüderitz is twinned with Lüderitz in Germany, part of the town of Tangerhütte since 2010.

== Culture ==
=== Media ===
Lüderitz has a local monthly newspaper, Buchter News. The paper, which was started as a source of free English-language reading material, is run by volunteers from the British gap year charity Project Trust.

=== Sport ===
Lüderitz is home to the Lüderitz Speed Challenge, the only international sporting event held in the town. This is an annual 6-week-long speed sailing event held in October and November each year under the auspices of the International Sailing Federation (ISAF) World Sailing Speed Record Council (WSSRC). The Event is the brainchild of French kitesurfer Sebastian Cattalan, who became the first sailor in history to break the 50 Knot barrier in the purpose-built canal with a speed of 50.26 Knots in 2008.

In October 2011, Turkish-born American adventurer Erden Eruç departed from Lüderitz Bay for the final ocean crossing of his Guinness world record-setting solo human-powered circumnavigation of the Earth. Eruç rowed to South America in an oceangoing rowboat, taking five months for the crossing to the town of Güiria, Venezuela.

== Notable people ==
- Mark Solms (born 1961), psychiatrist famous for Freudian exegesis.
- Manuel de Freitas, South African politician, born in Lüderitz, resident of Johannesburg since age 7.
- Ida Jimmy (1945–2024), independence activist, national hero
- Joseph Obgeb Jimmy (1951–2004), a Namibian diplomat.
- Zacharias Lewala (fl. 1908) discovered a diamond in 1908, starting a diamond rush in the area of Lüderitz.
- Anton Lubowski (1952–1989), a Namibian anti-apartheid activist and advocate. Assassinated
- Adolf Lüderitz (1834 in Bremen – 1886), German merchant and eponym for the town.
- Hilaria Mukapuli (born 1969), Namibian politician and a legislator; Mayor of Lüderitz, 2016- 2019.
- Friedel Sellschop (1930–2002), a South African scientist, pioneered in applied nuclear physics.
- Mvula ya Nangolo (1943–2019), a Namibian journalist and poet, grew up in Lüderitz.

== Education ==
Previously, the German school Deutsche Schule Lüderitzbucht (de) was located in the city. In 1965, it had 13 teachers and 140 learners and was supported by the German government. The school was closed in 1972 due to declining enrollment. The town currently has 3 primary and 2 secondary schools: Diaz, Nautilus, and Helene van Rhijn Primary, Lüderitz Junior Secondary, and Angra Pequena Senior Secondary schools.

== Landmarks ==
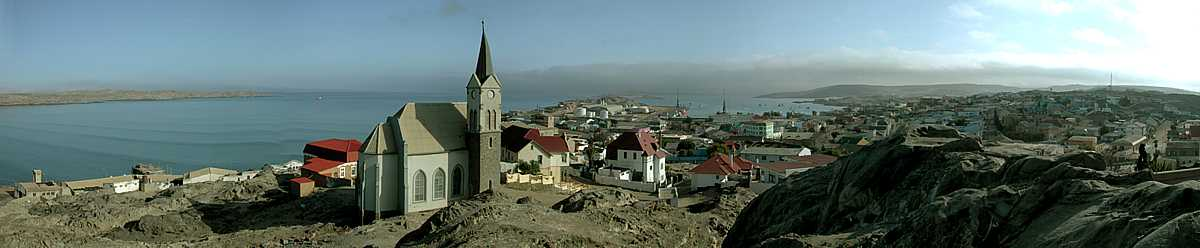
View of Felsenkirche and Lüderitz

- Deutsche Afrika Bank building, erected in 1907, national monument
- Felsenkirche (English: Rock Church) on Diamond Hill, a church in vertical Gothic style consecrated in 1912. After the diamond rush of 1908 and the completion of the railway line to Keetmanshoop, Lüderitz became permanently home to a significant white population. As a result, a number of churches were built. Felsenkirche, one of the oldest Lutheran churches in Namibia, has been a national monument since 1978.
- Glück Auf building, built 1907/08 for a lawyer of the diamond companies, declared a national monument in 2014
- Goerkehaus, the residence of Hans Goerke, manager and co-owner of the early diamond umbrella company, erected 1909–1911, national monument
- Kreplinhaus, the residence of the first mayor, Emil Kreplin, built in 1909, national monument
- Krabbenhöft & Lampe building, after co-owners Friedrich Wilhelm Krabbenhöft and Oscar Lampe. The predecessor of this business, the Handelsstation F.W. Krabbenhöft in Keetmanshoop, had existed since 1880 and was one of the first formally registered businesses in South West Africa. Erection of the building started in late 1909 and has been a national monument since 1979.
- Lüderitz Railway Station, erected in 1904, is also a national monument.
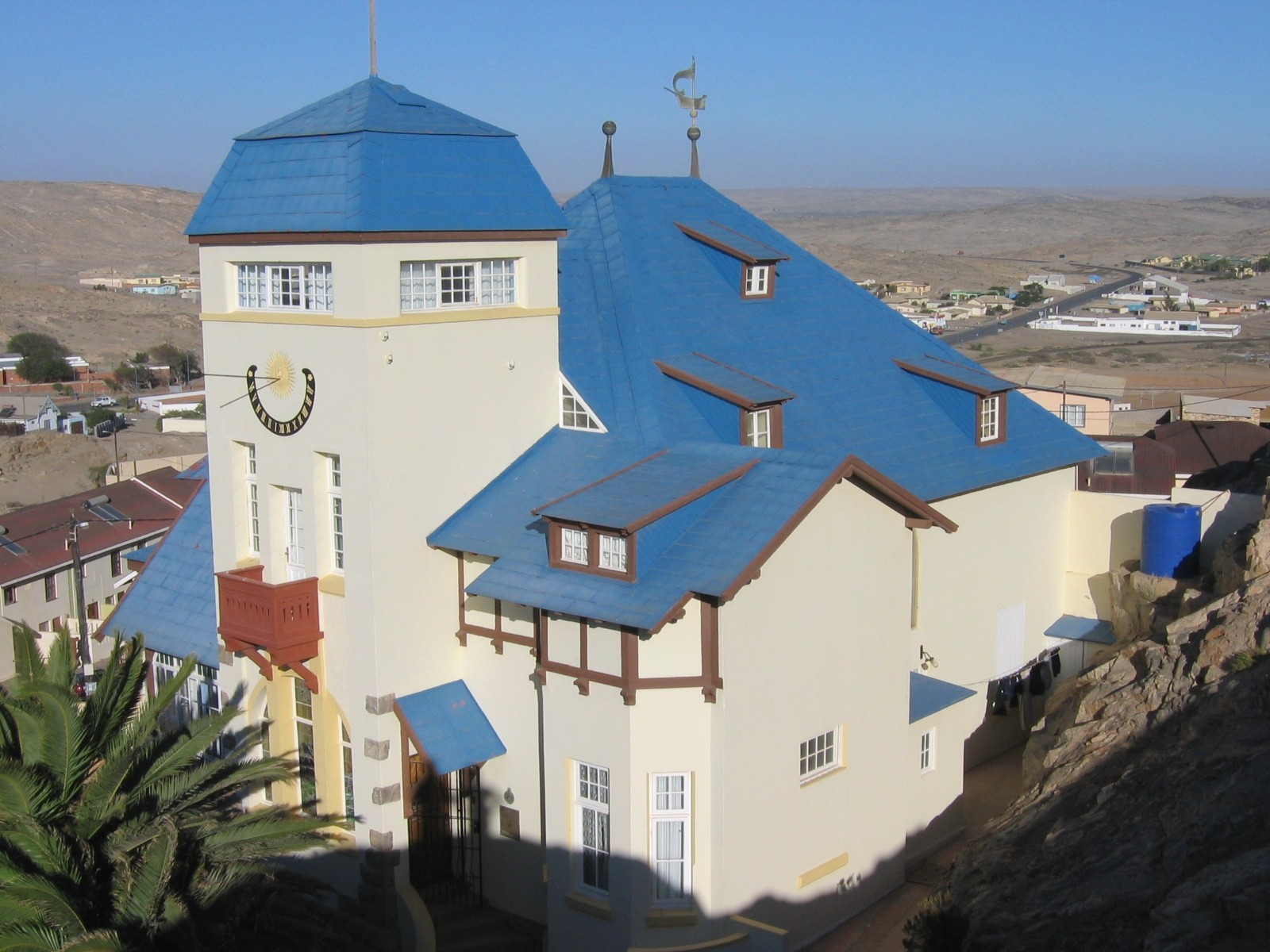
Goerke Haus

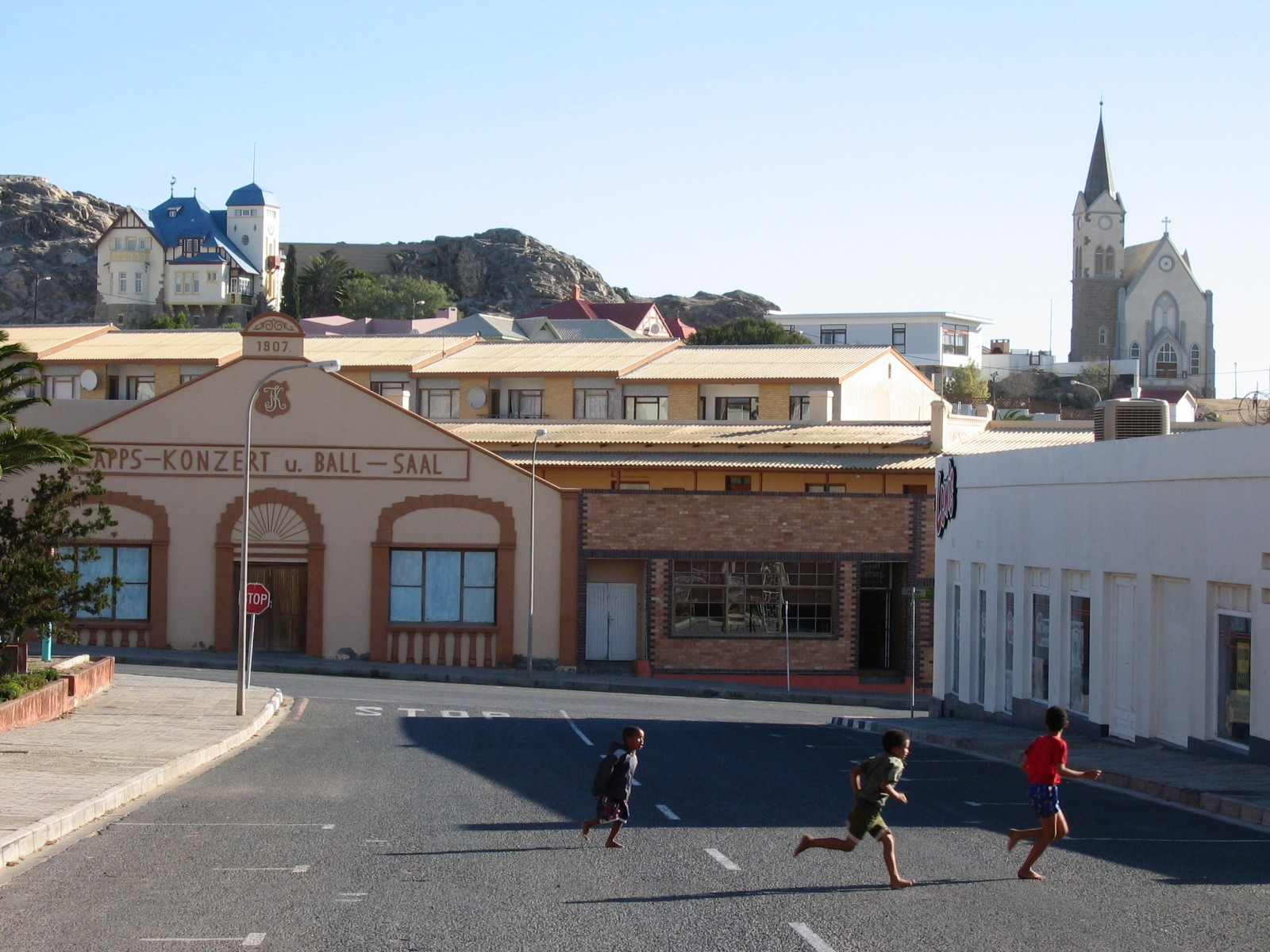
Kapps-Ballsaal with Felsenkirche and Goerke Haus in the background

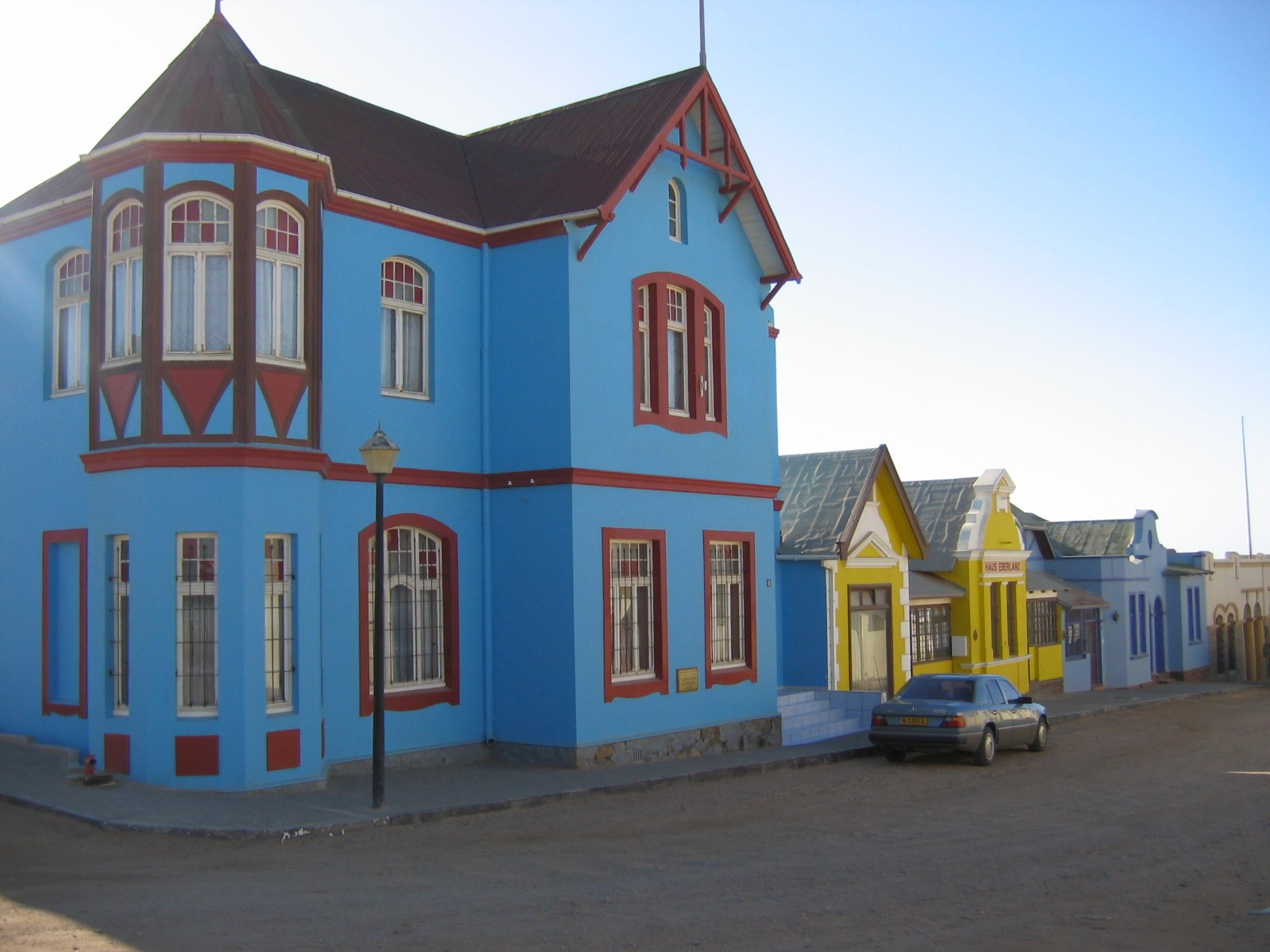
Bergstraße

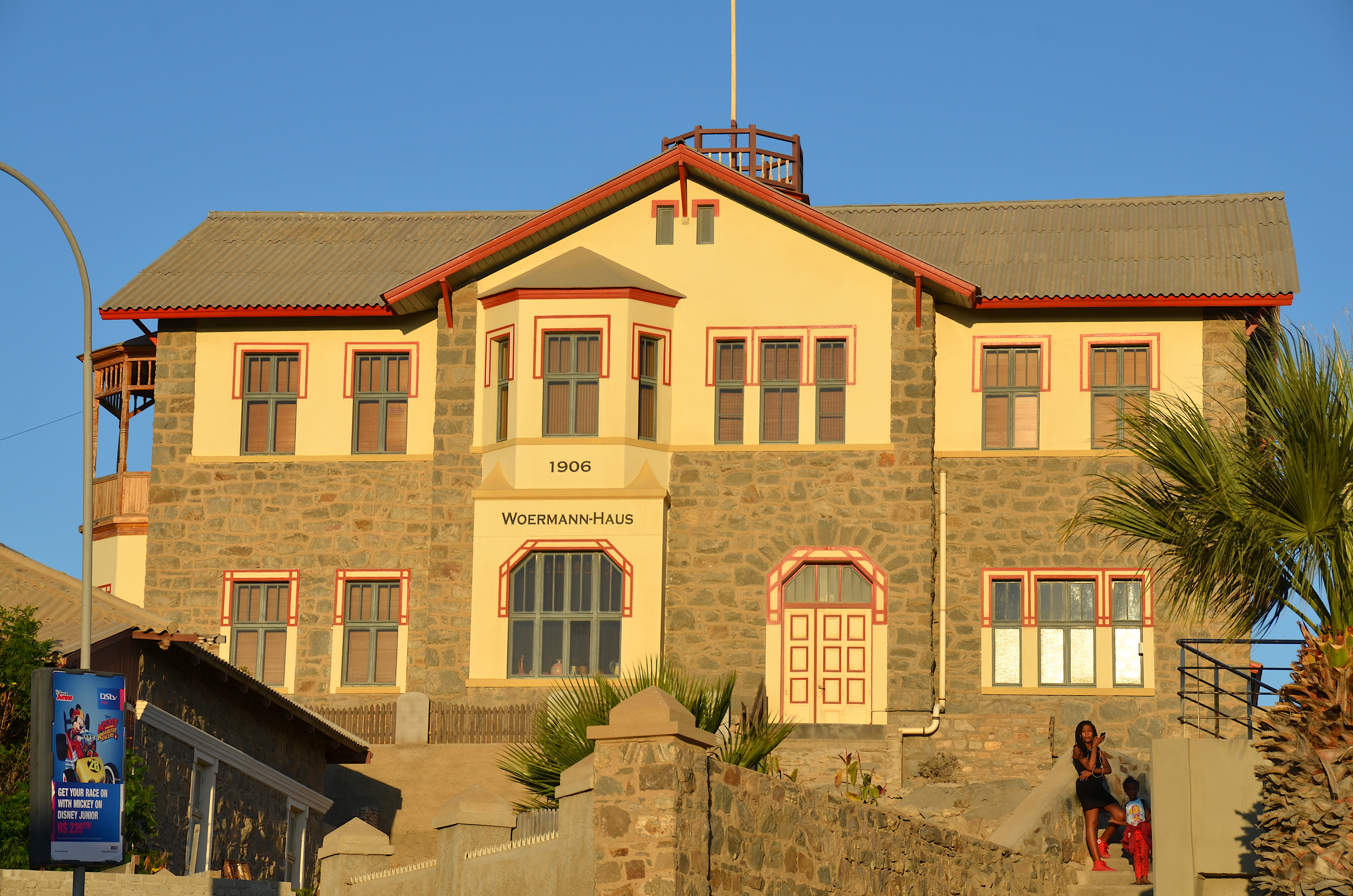
Woermannhaus (2017)

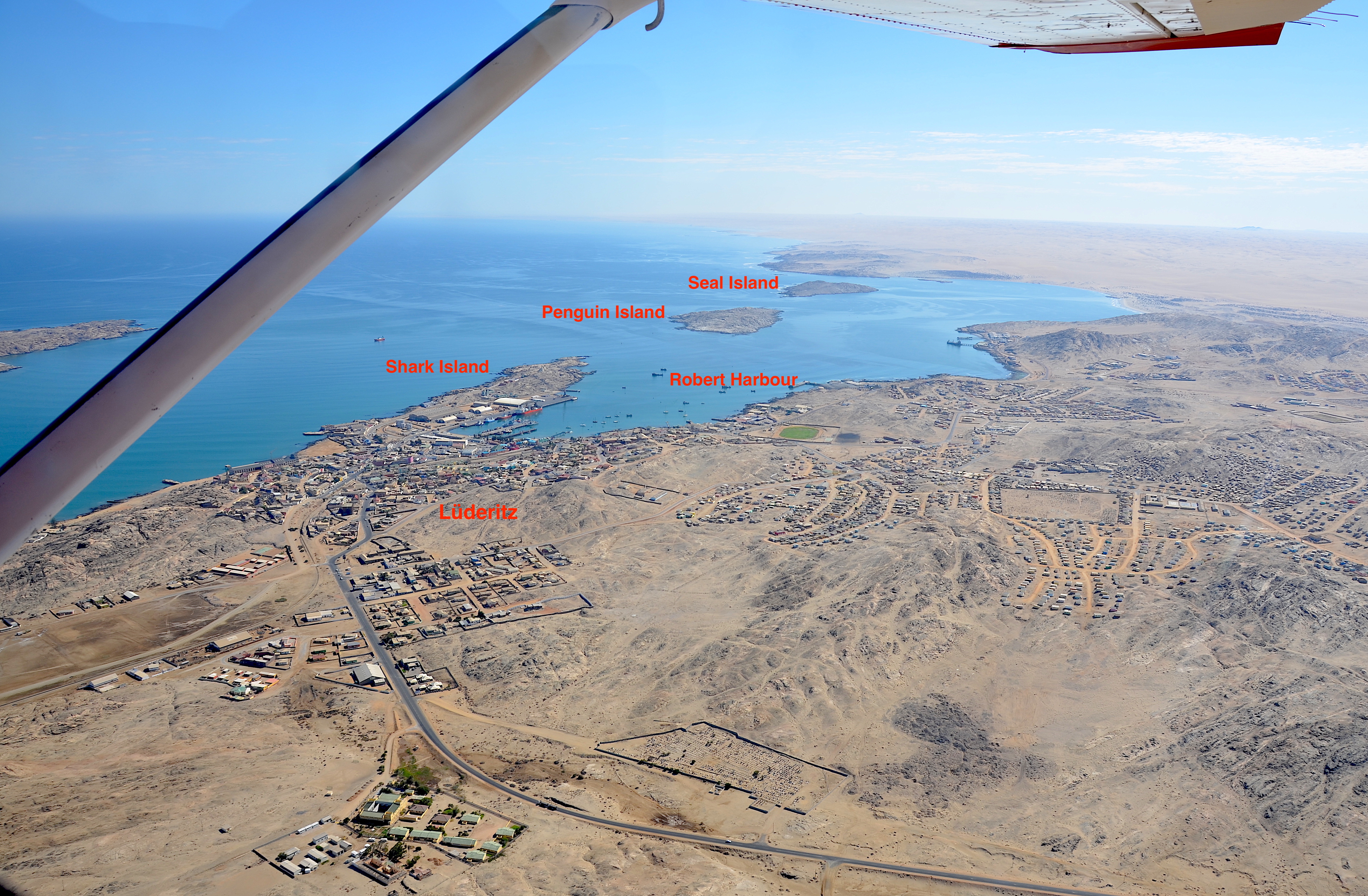
Lüderitz with Robert Harbour and Isles (2017)

== See also ==
- Lüderitz Reformed Church
