= Alario =

Alario is a surname. Notable people with the surname include:

- John Alario (born 1943), American politician
  - Alario Center, a 2,400-seat multi-purpose aren
- Lucas Alario (born 1992), Argentine footballer

== Birds ==
- Alario alario
- Alario leucolaemus
