= Tsau ǁKhaeb Sperrgebiet National Park =

Diamond mining area in the Namib Desert, southwestern Namibia

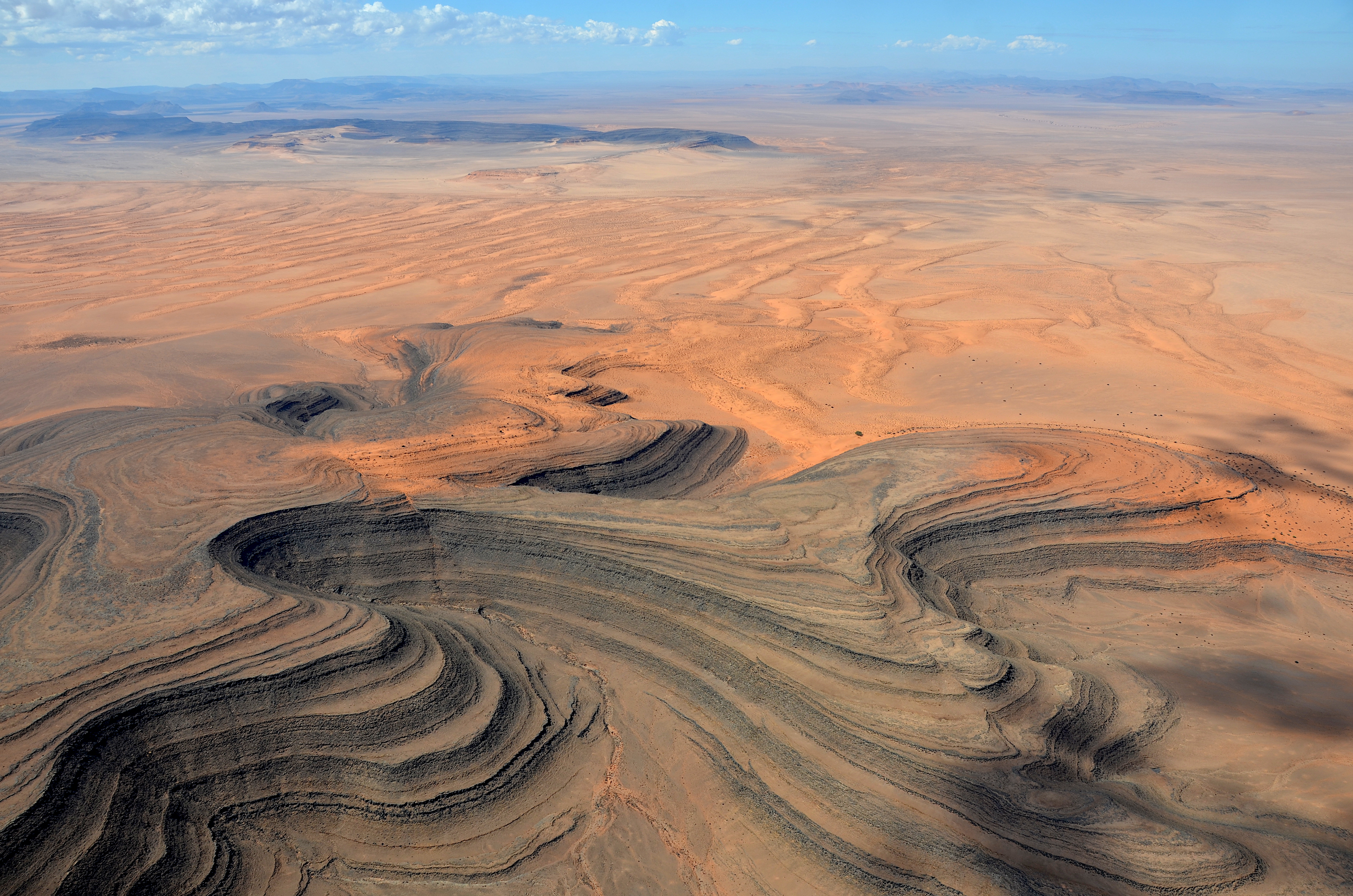
Aerial view of Sperrgebiet Namibia (2017) 27°11′01″S 016°10′14″E

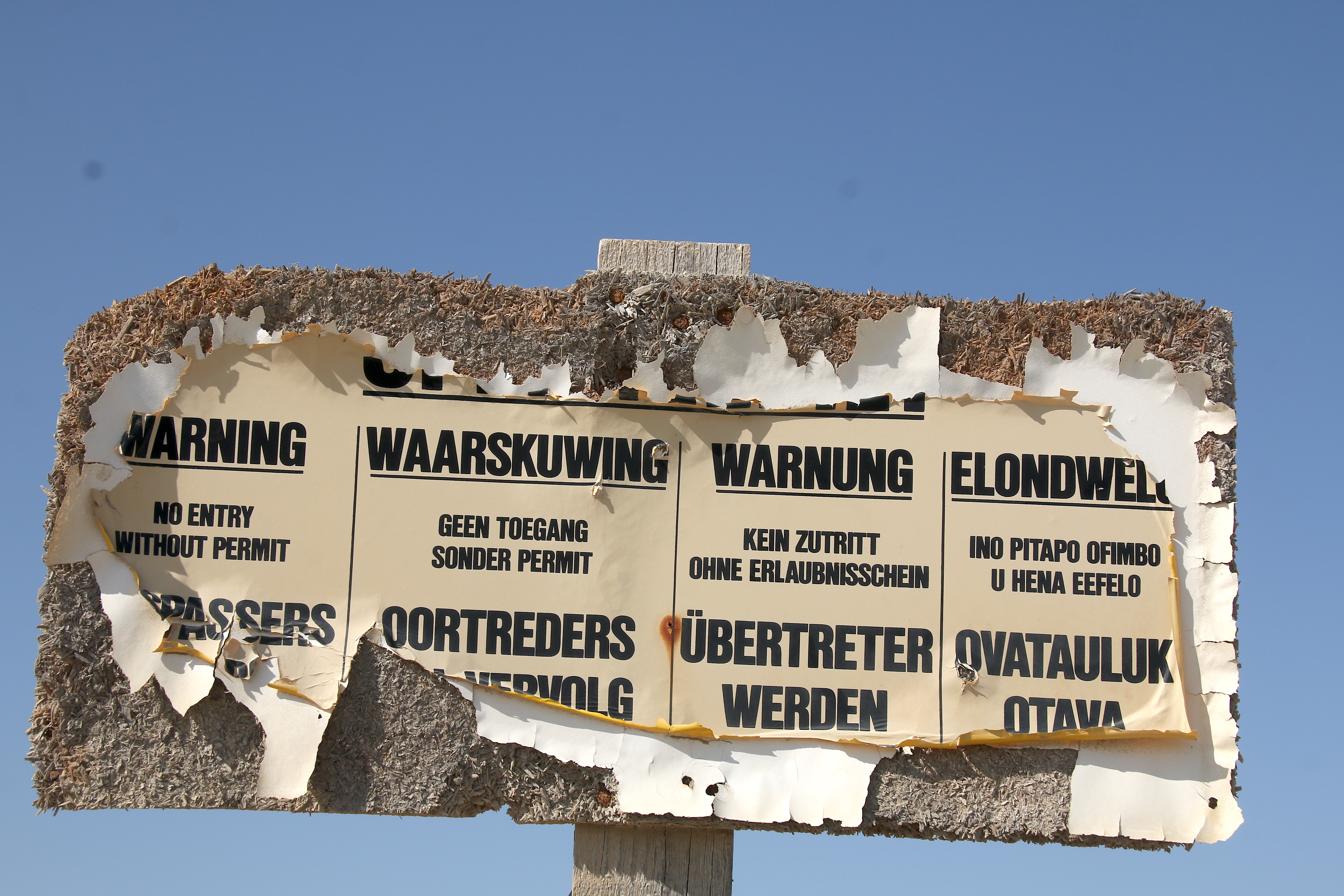
Sperrgebiet warning sign

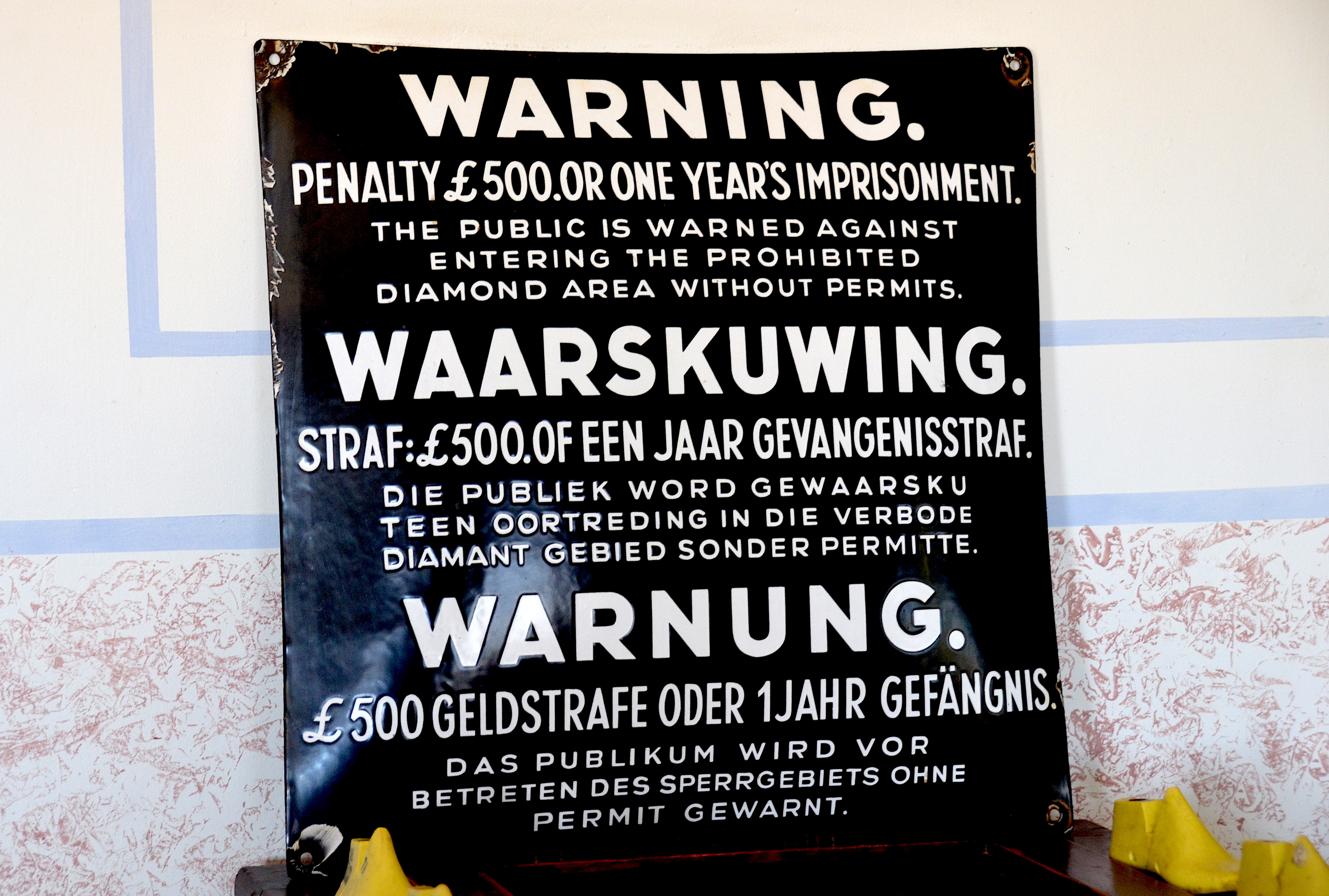
Warning sign from the 1940s

The Tsau ǁKhaeb (Sperrgebiet) National Park or just Sperrgebiet National Park, formerly known as Sperrgebiet (German, meaning "Prohibited Area"; also known as Diamond Area 1), is a diamond mining area in southwestern Namibia, in the Namib Desert. It spans the Atlantic Ocean-facing coast from Oranjemund on the border with South Africa, to around 72 kilometres (45 mi) north of Lüderitz, a distance of 320 km (200 mi) north. It extends to around 100 km (62 mi) inland, and its total area of 26,000 km^{2} (10,000 sq mi) makes up three percent of Namibia's land mass. However, mining only takes place in five percent of the Sperrgebiet, with most of the area acting as a buffer zone. Members of the public are banned from entering most of the area, despite the creation of a national park there in 2004.

== History ==
After the first diamond was found in April 1908 by August Stauch near Grasplatz station, a diamond rush was triggered in German South West Africa. In September 1908, the German government created the Sperrgebiet in its colony in order to make its South West African enterprise profitable, giving sole rights for mining to the Deutsche Diamantengesellschaft ("German Diamond Company"). In 1915, during World War I, South African forces led by General Jan Smuts and Louis Botha, the South African Prime Minister, invaded the country. The South Africans defeated the Germans, taking control of modern-day Namibia, including the Sperrgebiet. The owner of the mine, De Beers, had total control of the area until the 1990s, when the Namibian government purchased a fifty-percent stake. They formed a joint partnership called the Namdeb Diamond Corporation.

== Nature ==
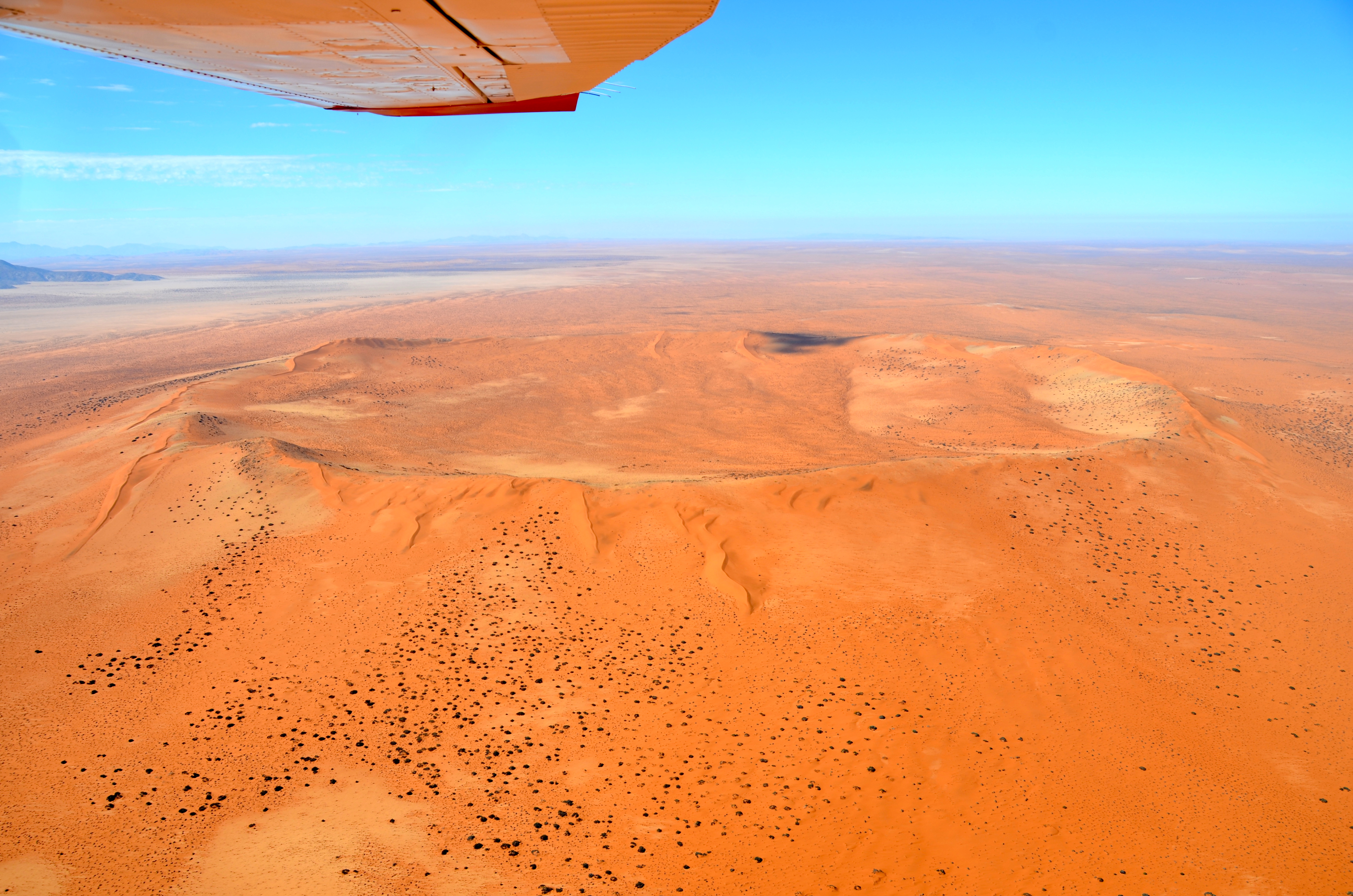
Aerial view of Roter Kamm within Sperrgebiet (2017) 27°45′55″S 016°17′21″E

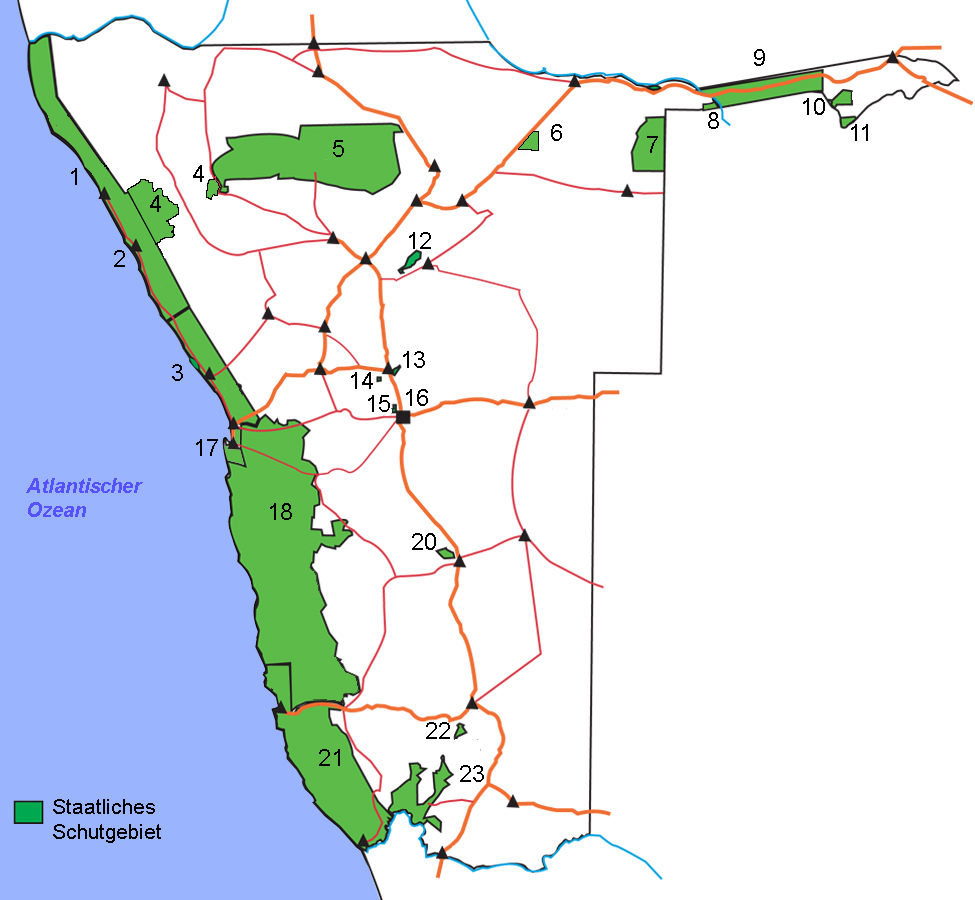
Map showing National Parks in Namibia (Sperrgebiet is #21)

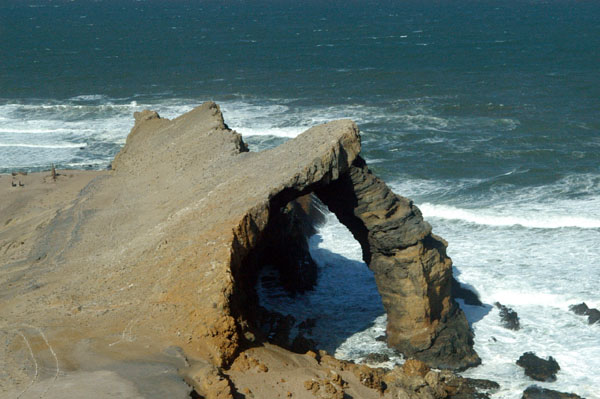
Bogenfels (bow rock), a landmark in the Sperrgebiet. It is a 55-metre-high (180 ft) rock arch on the Atlantic Coast.

The mining area close to Bogenfels is called "Pocket Beaches" which is one of Namdeb's northern coastal mines. The Sperrgebiet has a diverse range of flora and fauna, due to little human intervention in the area for 100 years. Forty percent of the landscape is desert, thirty percent is grassland, and twenty-eight percent is rocky. Roter Kamm, an impact crater in the southern Namib Desert within the Sperrgebiet, has a diameter of 2.5 km (1.6 mi). The area includes the Tsaus Mountains, Mount Aurus, Mount Heioab, Mount Höchster, the Klinghardt Mountains and the permanent water spring Kaukausib. The highest point of the Sperrgebiet is 1,488 m (4,882 ft).

There are 776 types of plants in the Sperrgebiet, with 234 being endemic to southwest Namibia, despite the Orange River being the only permanent water supply in the area. A study has shown that climate change will affect the plant life in the area, specifically in the Succulent Karoo. Drier winters may lead to the extinction of these plants, as they are endemic to the Sperrgebiet. According to Morgan Hauptfleisch, a scientist who works at the Southern African Institute for Environmental Assessment, the Sperrgebiet "is the only arid biodiversity hotspot and this makes it a very special area". It has more biodiversity than anywhere else in Namibia, supporting animals such as the gemsbok, springbok, and brown hyena. Bird species resident in the Sperrgebiet include the African oystercatcher, the black-headed canary, and the dune lark.

== National park and recent history ==
The Sperrgebiet was designated as a national park in June 2004, and is now named Tsau ǁKhaeb National Park. De Beers still controls the area, but will relinquish control to the Namibian Ministry for Environment and Tourism once a management plan for the park has been completed. It is also a proclaimed diamond area which needs thorough control so as to keep possible diamond theft at bay. In April 2008, the 500-year-old wreck of a ship named Bom Jesus containing Iberian coins, bronze cannons, copper, and ivory was found in the Sperrgebiet. Under Namibian law, the Namibian government is entitled to all the items found on board. These items will be showcased at a museum in Oranjemund once the museum has been constructed.

There are several ghost towns in the Sperrgebiet. Built in the late 19th century, the best known of these is Kolmanskop. Others include Pomona and Elizabeth Bay. The wind has partially excavated a number of half-mummified bodies at a graveyard outside one of these ghost towns.

== Economic use ==
In 2021, the government of Namibia announced a US$9.4 billion green hydrogen project in the Tsau ǁKhaeb National Park. The plant will ultimately produce 300,000 tons of hydrogen, either as pure green hydrogen or in derivative form (green ammonia). It will be built and operated for 40 years by HYPHEN Hydrogen Energy (Pty) Ltd, a joint venture between Nicholas Holdings Limited and ENERTRAG South Africa (Pty) Ltd. The renewable electricity generation capacity will be 2 GW until 2026 and 5 GW until the late 2020s. The investment amount lies in the same order of magnitude as the total GDP of Namibia at the time of planning. Nearly 15,000 direct jobs during construction and 3,000 further jobs during operation will be created. More than 90% will be filled by Namibians. According to Raffinetti, the CEO of HYPHEN: "The Tsau ǁKhaeb National Park is among the top 5 locations in the world for low-cost hydrogen production, benefiting from a combination of co-located onshore wind and solar resources near the sea and land export routes to market."

== Gallery ==
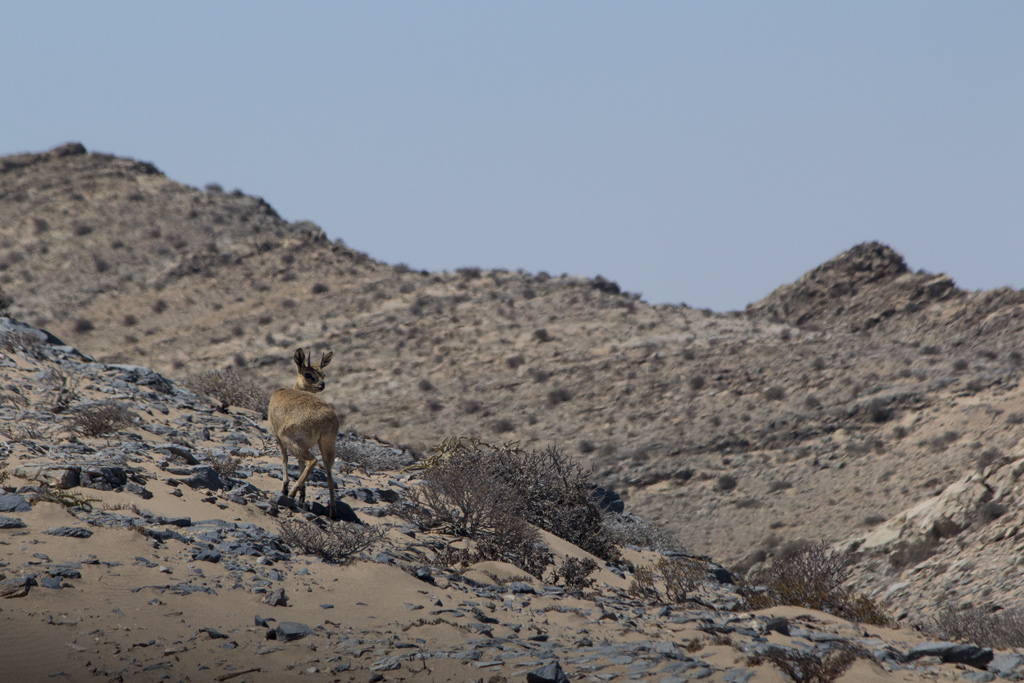
Klipspringer in Sperrgebiet

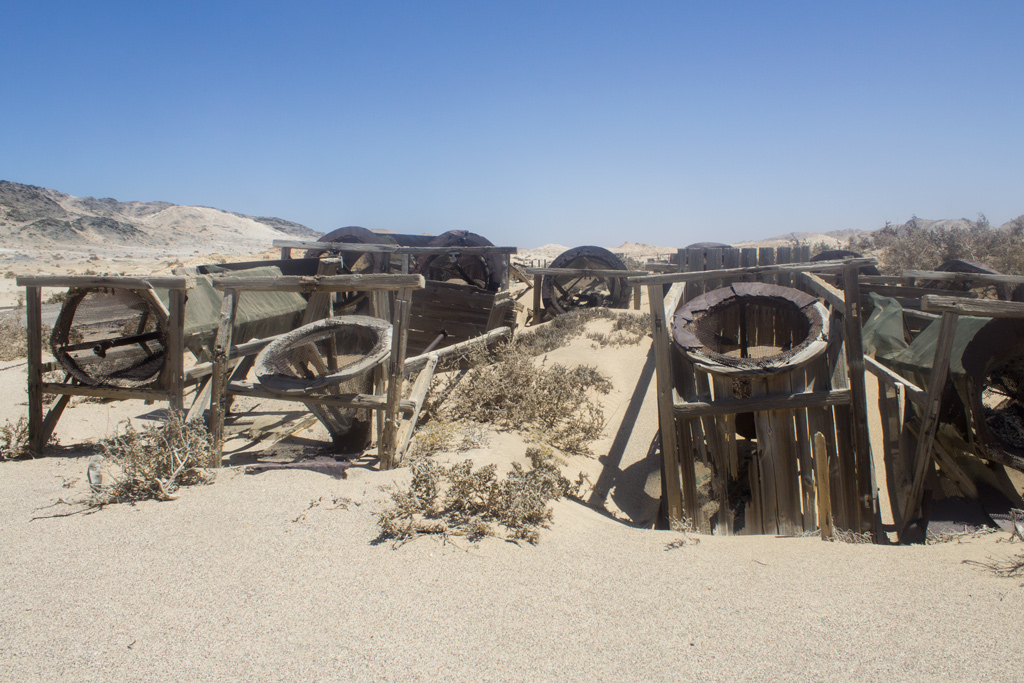
Large sieves once used to sift diamonds

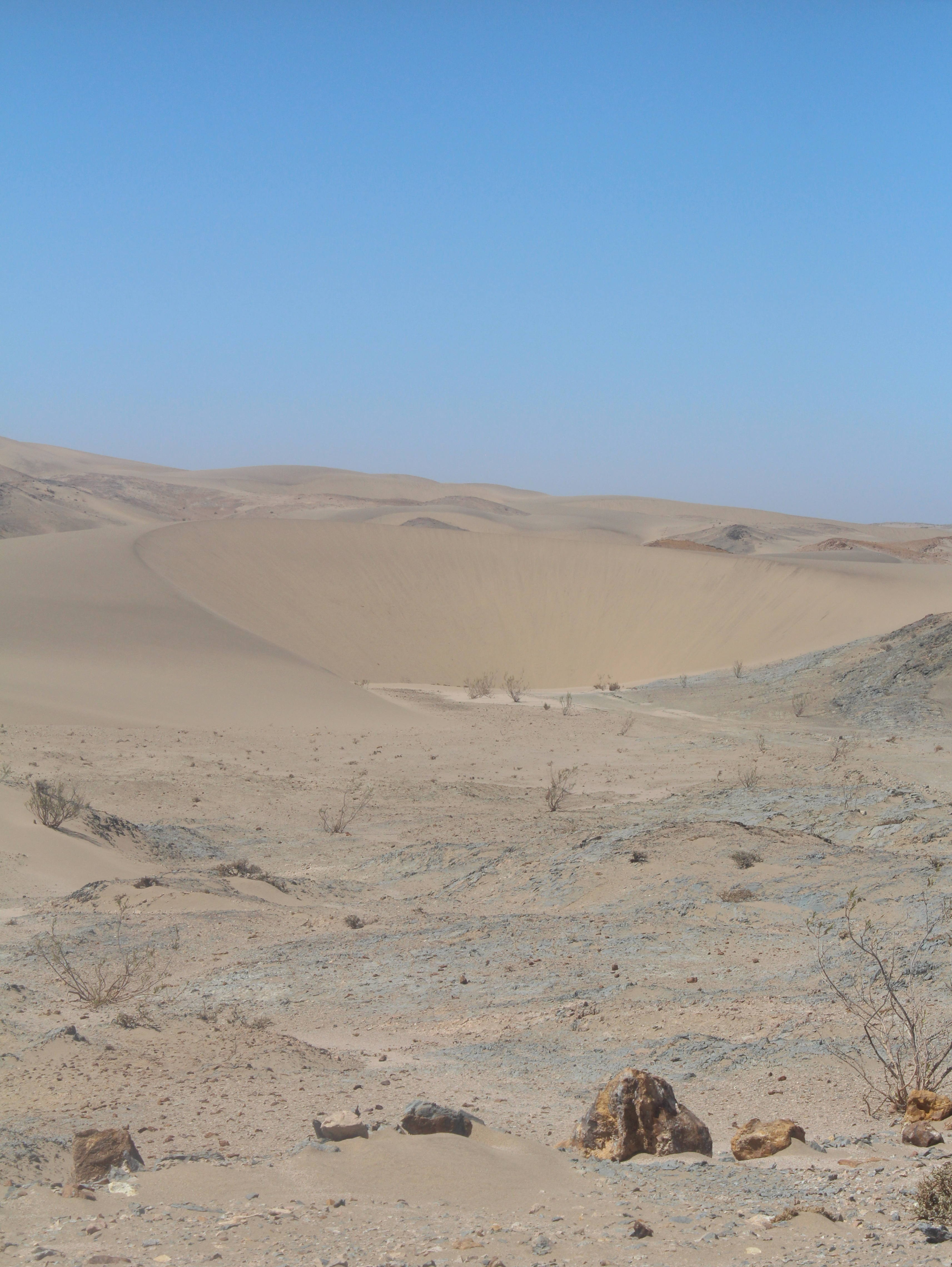
A travelling barchan dune in Sperrgebiet

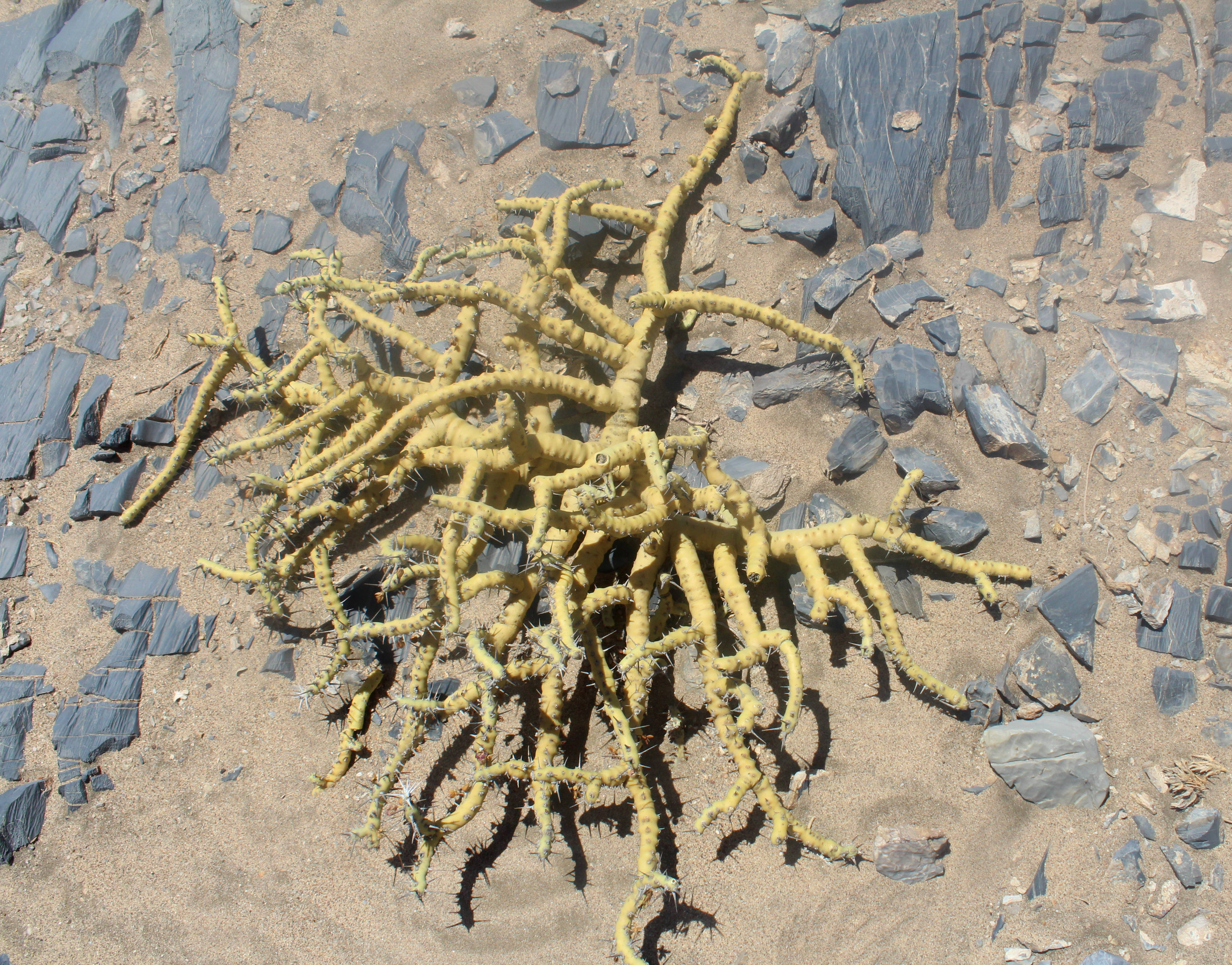
Dried up plant locals call 'Bushman's candle'

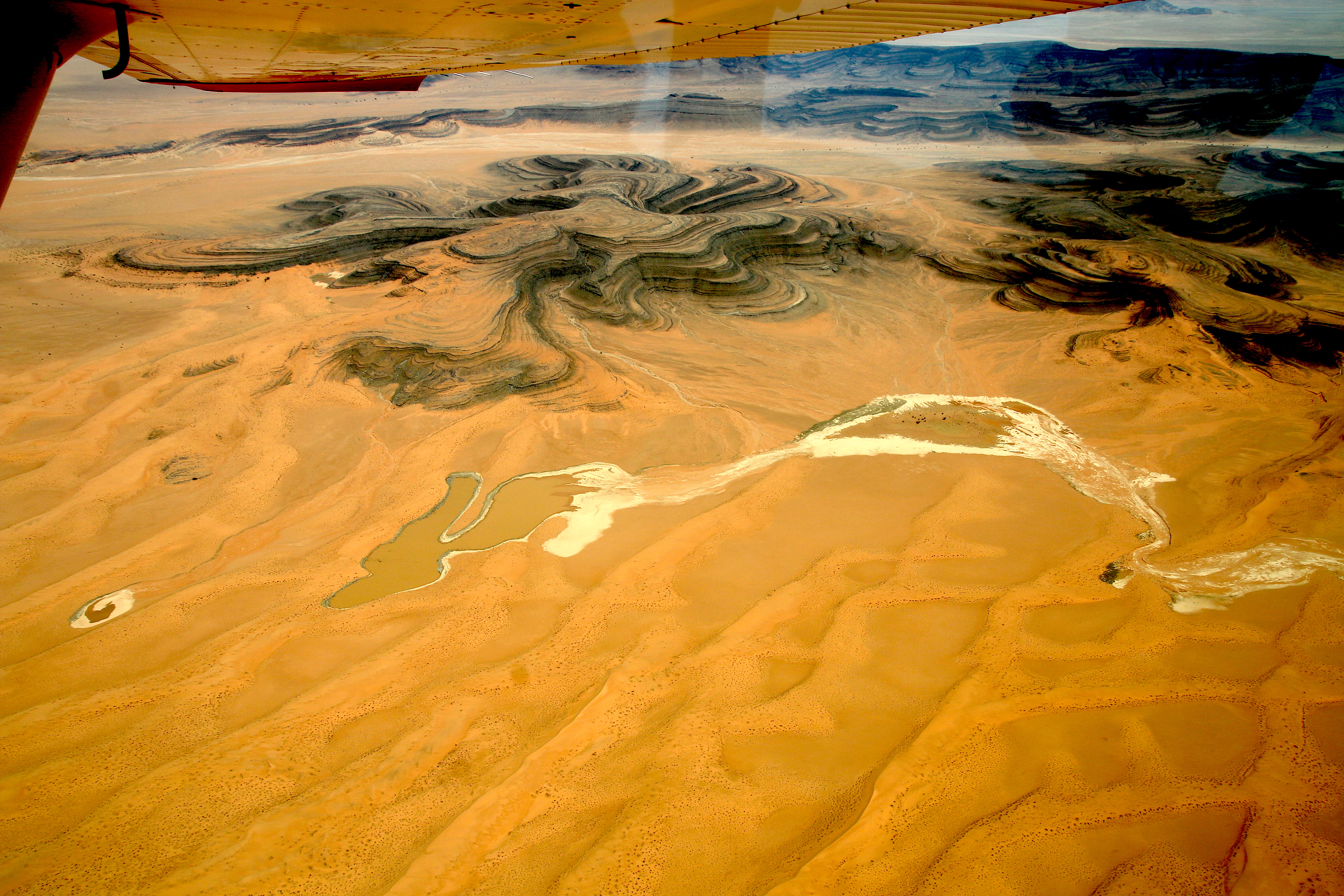
Mountain Range in "Sperrgebiet National Park"

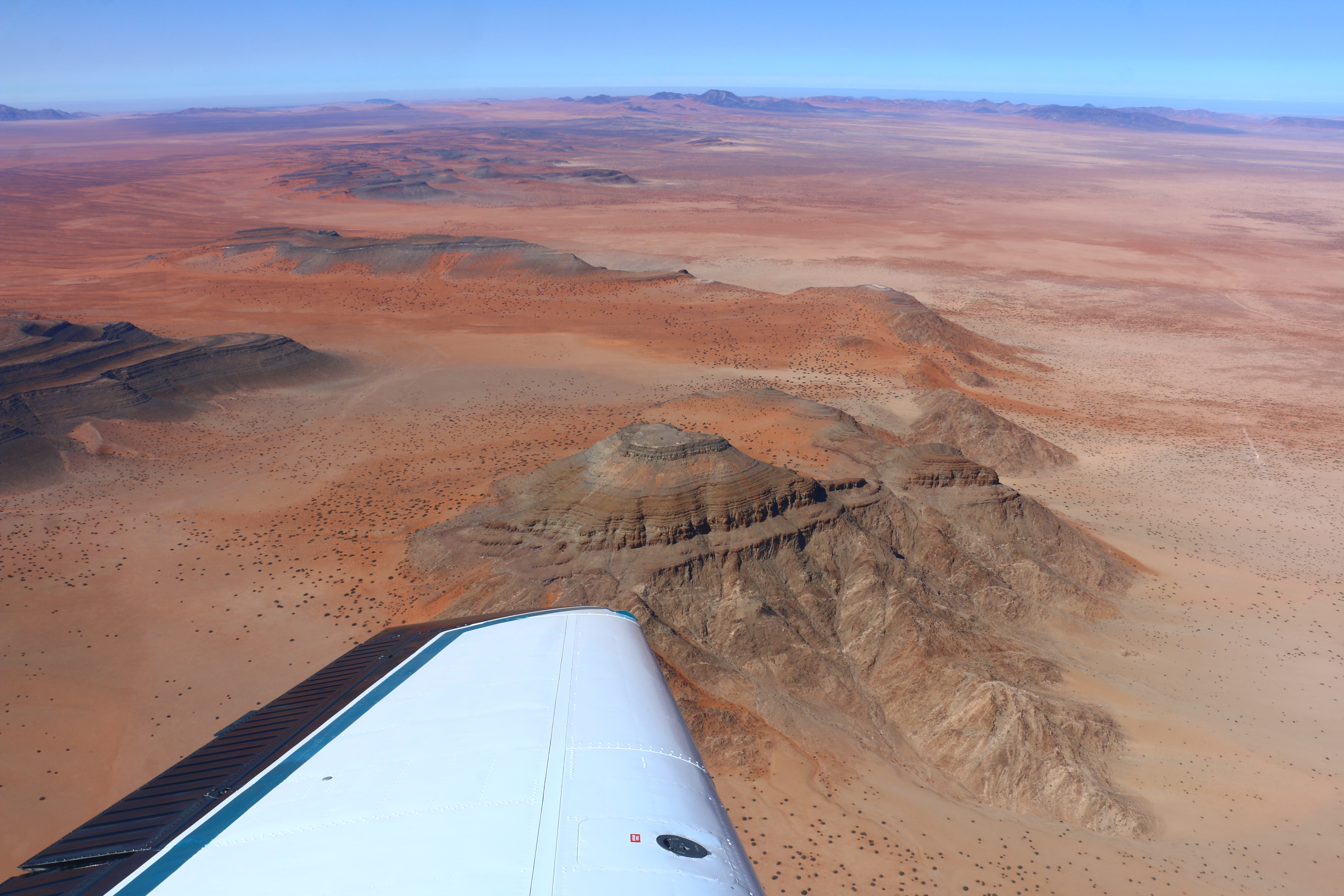
Flight over Sperrgebiet National Park

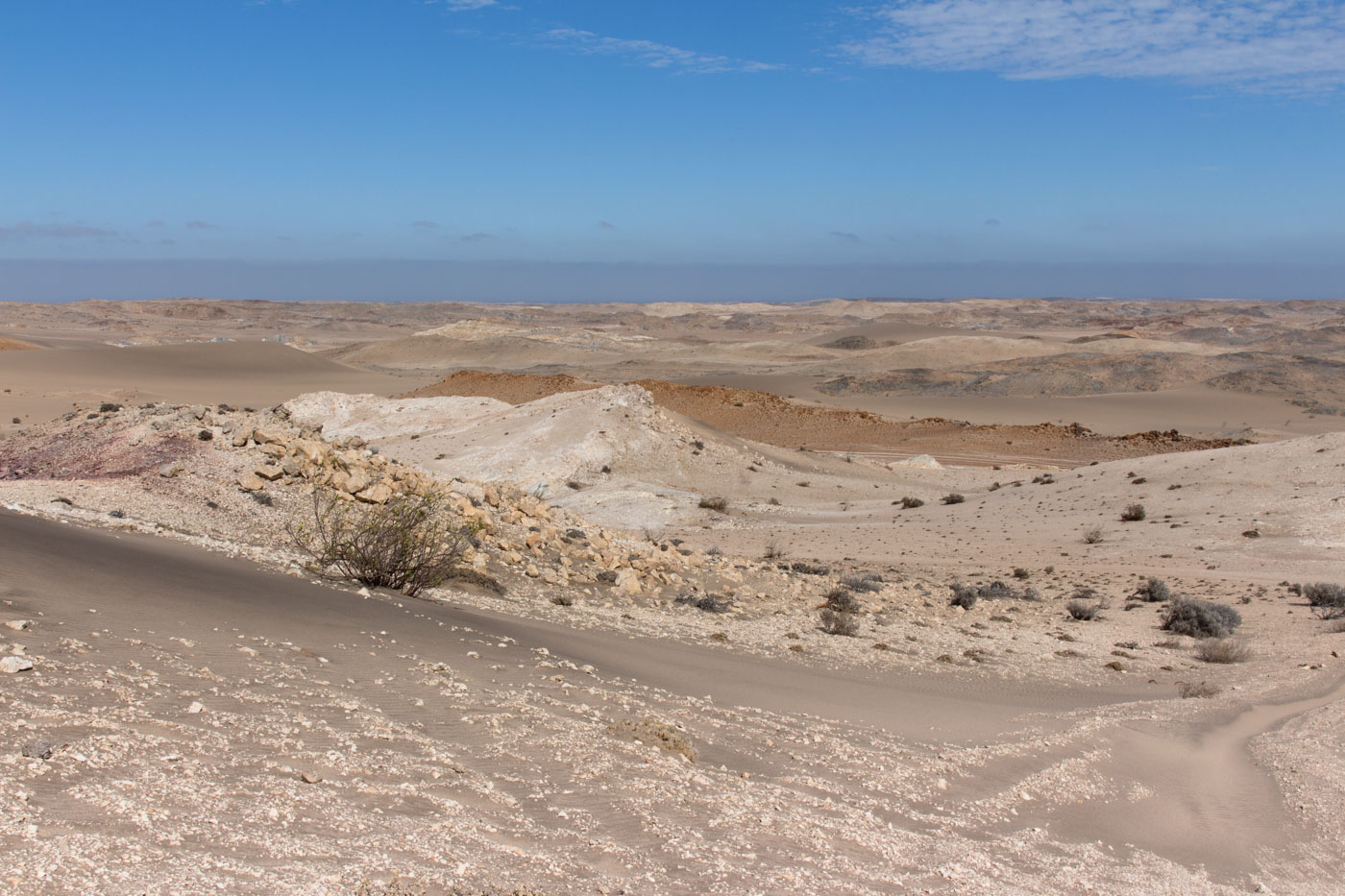
View over the Area
