= Heioab =

Mountain in Namibia

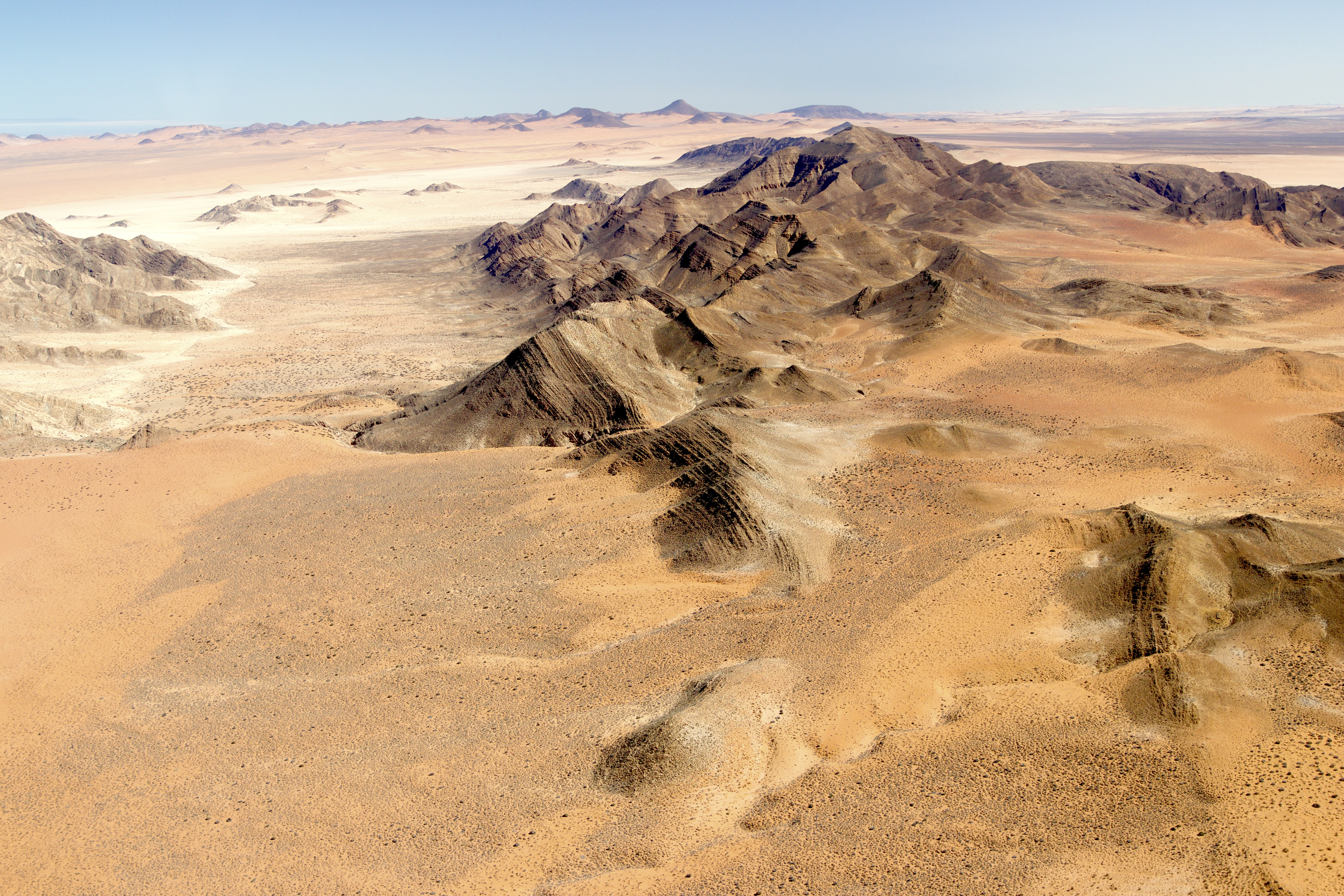
- Aerial view of Heioab in the Diamond Restricted Area (2018). Höchster is visible on the horizon.

Highest point
- Elevation: 1,090 m (3,580 ft)
- Coordinates: 27°25′11″S 015°59′09″E

Geography
- Location within Namibia
- Country: Namibia
- Region: ǁKaras

Heioab is a mountain in the Diamond Restricted Aerea, also called Sperrgebiet, in the southwestern part of Namibia. It reaches a height of 1,090 m. Its extent is about 7 km × 10 km.

20 km northwest of Heioab is Mount Höchster.

Several parts of the mountain range are covered with sand which is blown there by sandstorms. The average yearly rainfall in this area of the Namib amounts to just a few millimetres.

The bushes to be found in the mountains just survive because of the mist, which sometimes is formed above the cold Atlantic and then during daytime drifts far into the desert. The few Camel Thorn trees take their water from deep underground accumulations.

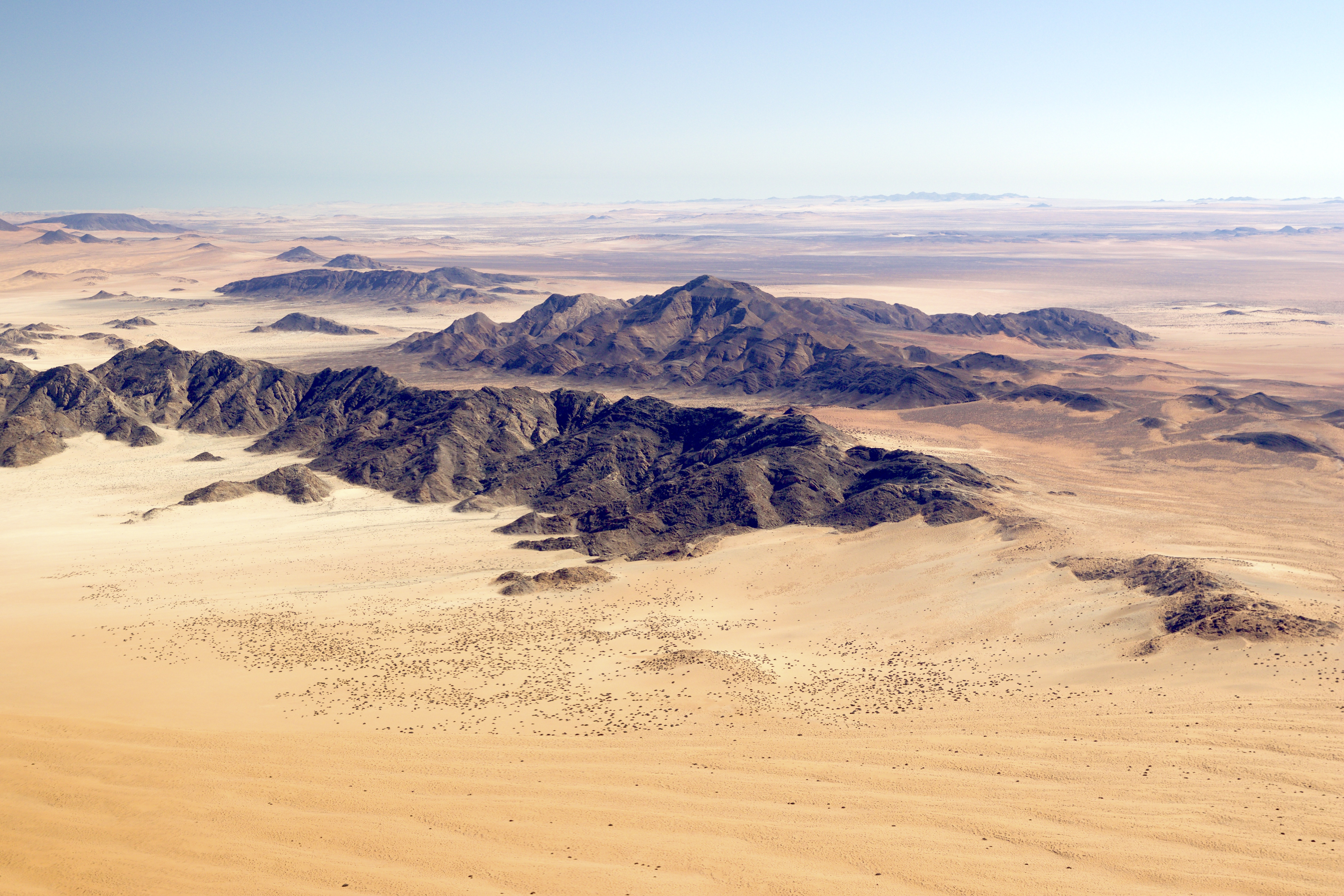
Aerial view of Heioab in the Diamond Restricted Aerea (2018). Direction of view North
