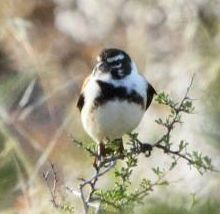
- Male

Scientific classification
- Kingdom: Animalia
- Phylum: Chordata
- Class: Aves
- Order: Passeriformes
- Family: Fringillidae
- Subfamily: Carduelinae
- Genus: Serinus
- Species: S. alario
- Subspecies: S. a. leucolaema

Trinomial name
- Serinus alario leucolaema (Sharpe, 1903)

= Damara canary =

Subspecies of bird

The Damara canary (Serinus alario leucolaema) is a small passerine bird in the finch family.

== Taxonomy ==
The taxonomic status of this bird is uncertain. It is listed by the International Ornithologists' Union as a subspecies of the black-headed canary (Serinus alario).

== Description ==
The Damara canary is 12–15 cm in length. The adult male has rich brown upper parts and tail, a white hind collar and mainly white underparts. The head pattern is striking; whereas the male black-headed canary has a solidly black head and central breast, the Damara canary has a white supercilium, and a white throat and foreneck with a black moustachial stripe. The black of the central breast is therefore separate from the black of the head.

The adult female is similar, but has a dull grey head, and is dark-streaked on the head and upper parts. It has a rich brown wing bar. The female is similar to the female black-headed canary, but shows faint traces of the male head pattern. The juvenile resembles the female, but is paler and has streaking on the breast and a weaker wing bar.

== Distribution and habitat ==
It is a resident breeder in South Africa, Namibia and southern Botswana. It is sometimes placed in the genus Alario as Alario leucolaema, and some authorities treat it as a subspecies of the black-headed canary (Serinus alario). Its habitat is dry open scrub and grassland, the edges of cultivation, and suburban gardens.

== Behaviour ==
The Damara canary is a common and gregarious seed-eater, forming flocks of up to 200 birds. Its call is a low tseett, and the male's song is a jumble of unmusical notes.
