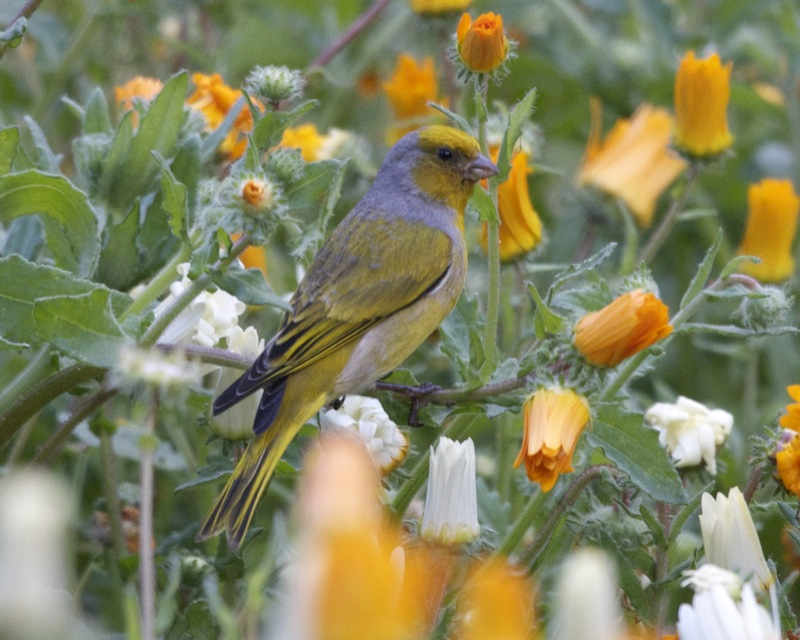

Conservation status
- Least Concern (IUCN 3.1)

Scientific classification
- Kingdom: Animalia
- Phylum: Chordata
- Class: Aves
- Order: Passeriformes
- Family: Fringillidae
- Subfamily: Carduelinae
- Genus: Serinus
- Species: S. canicollis

Binomial name
- Serinus canicollis (Swainson, 1838)

Subspecies
- 3, see text

= Cape canary =

Species of bird

The Cape canary (Serinus canicollis) is a small passerine bird in the finch family. It is a resident breeder in southern Africa and has been introduced to Mauritius and Réunion. It is a residential bird but shows seasonal and altitudinal movements, sometimes forming large flocks outside the breeding season.

Its habitat is fynbos, grassland and gardens, preferably in highland areas. It builds a compact cup nest in a scrub. It inhabits a variety of terrestrial habitats, from forest edges to montane areas, foraging mainly on seeds in pairs or flocks. Breeding occurs from August to February. Nest are built by females and both parents feed chicks, which typically fledge in 2-3 weeks.

The Cape canary is 11–13 cm in length. The adult male has a green back with black edging to the wing feathers wings and tail. The underparts, rump and tail sides are yellow, and the lower belly is white. The rear head and neck are grey, and the face is cinnamon. The female is similar, but with less grey on the head. The juvenile has greenish-yellow underparts with heavy brown streaking. This species is easily distinguished from the yellow-fronted canary by its lack of black face markings.

The Cape canary is a common and gregarious seed-eater. Its call is tsit-it-it, and the song is warbled goldfinch-like trills and whistles given in display flight or from a high perch.

This species is listed as least concern by the International Union for Conservation of Nature Red List categories, with a stable population across a large range.

== Movement and Migration ==
The Cape canary is mostly residential but also shows some seasonal migration. Birds occurring at higher altitudes in Zimbabwe tend to move down to lower areas outside of their breeding season. The Cape canary is a land bird. It is found at 2000-3000 metres altitude of land and resides in terrestrial areas. This bird on average has a life span of 3.8 years. They also move with irregular flocks sometimes, traveling to non-breeding areas such as the northern Karoo. In the southern Cape, numbers increase during spring, while the species is largely absent from the drier northern parts of its range in summer.

== Habitat and Foraging ==
The Cape canary occupies a wide range of habitats. It is commonly found along the edges and clearings of lowland and lower montane forests, including areas with African juniper and Podocarpus trees. Cape canaries mostly feed on soft green seeds. They forage among low vegetation within reach of flowers and shrubs, taking seeds directly from the ground or flower heads. They forage in pairs and flocks of up to 50 birds during breeding season. In non-breeding seasons they join other flocks to forage with up to 500 birds.

== Breeding ==
Breeding occurs from mostly August to February. They pair up and often nest in loose groups. The male does a slow flight while singing loudly, then swoops and chases the female canary. The female becomes droop-winged in response. The female typically builds the nest, usually made of roots, plant fluff, moss, hair, and feathers. It is placed 1–20 m up in a tree or vine. They lay 2–5 speckled eggs. The female broods the eggs for about 2 weeks. Both parents feed the chicks, which leave the nest after about 2–3 weeks, sometimes before they can properly fly. Most egg and chick losses are from predators and parasites. They can live at least 5 years.

== Red List Category ==
The International Union of Conservation of Nature (IUCN) lists Cape canaries as “Least Concern” category on the Red List. The Cape canary shows a stable population trend. Its extent of occurrence is 1,570,000 km^{2}.

== Subspecies ==
Three subspecies are recognised:

- Serinus canicollis griseitergum Clancey, PA, 1967 — highlands of eastern Zimbabwe and adjacent Mozambique
- Serinus canicollis thompsonae Roberts, A, 1924 — northern and eastern South Africa (southward to eastern Free State and southern KwaZulu-Natal), Lesotho, and western Eswatini
- Serinus canicollis canicollis (Swainson, WJ, 1838) — southern South Africa (Western Cape eastward to western Free State and northeastern Eastern Cape)

The East African yellow-crowned canary (S. flavivertex) was formerly often considered a subspecies of S. canicollis, as S. c. flavivertex; is very distinctive, much brighter, and with a yellow head, lacking the grey colour.

== Gallery ==
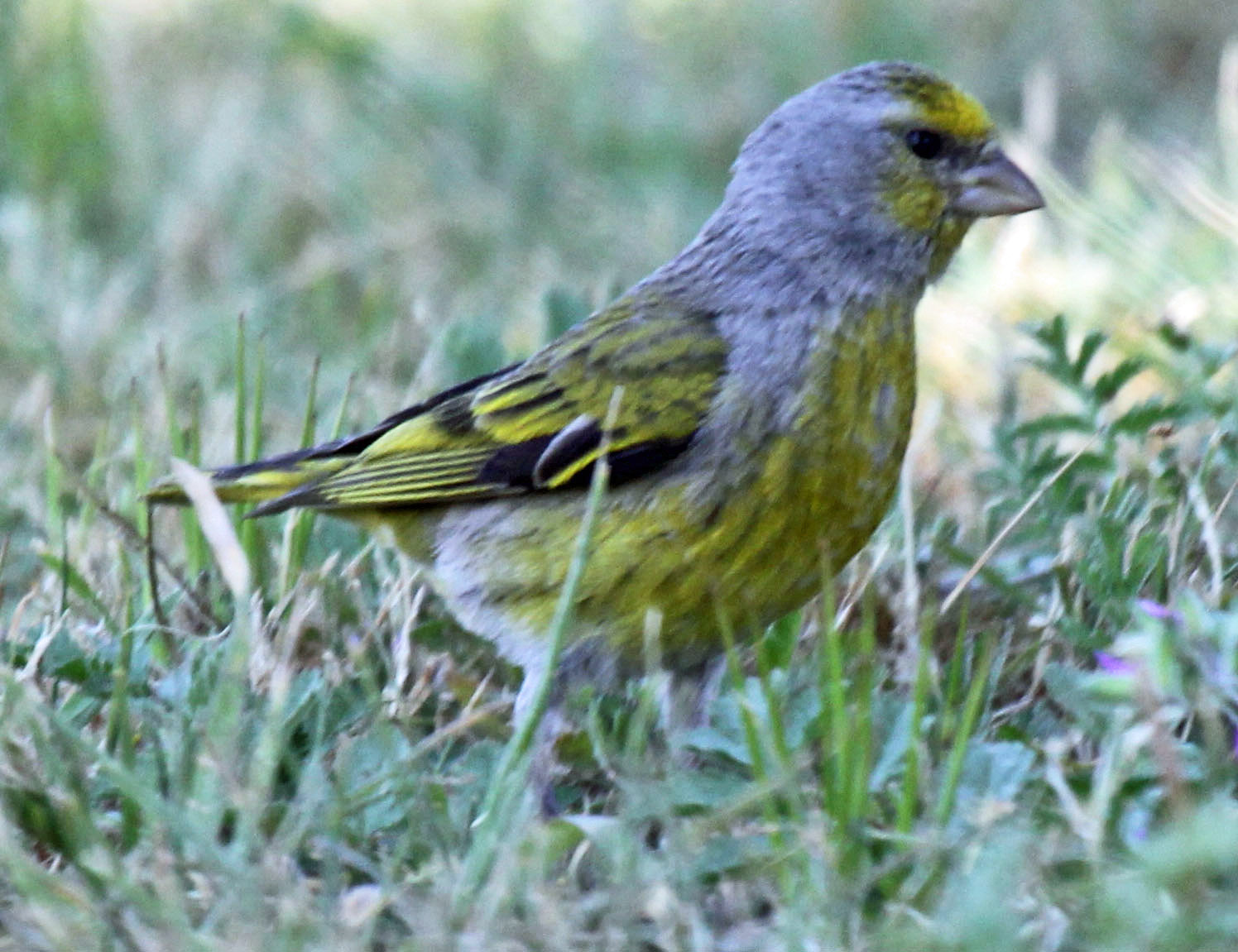
South Africa

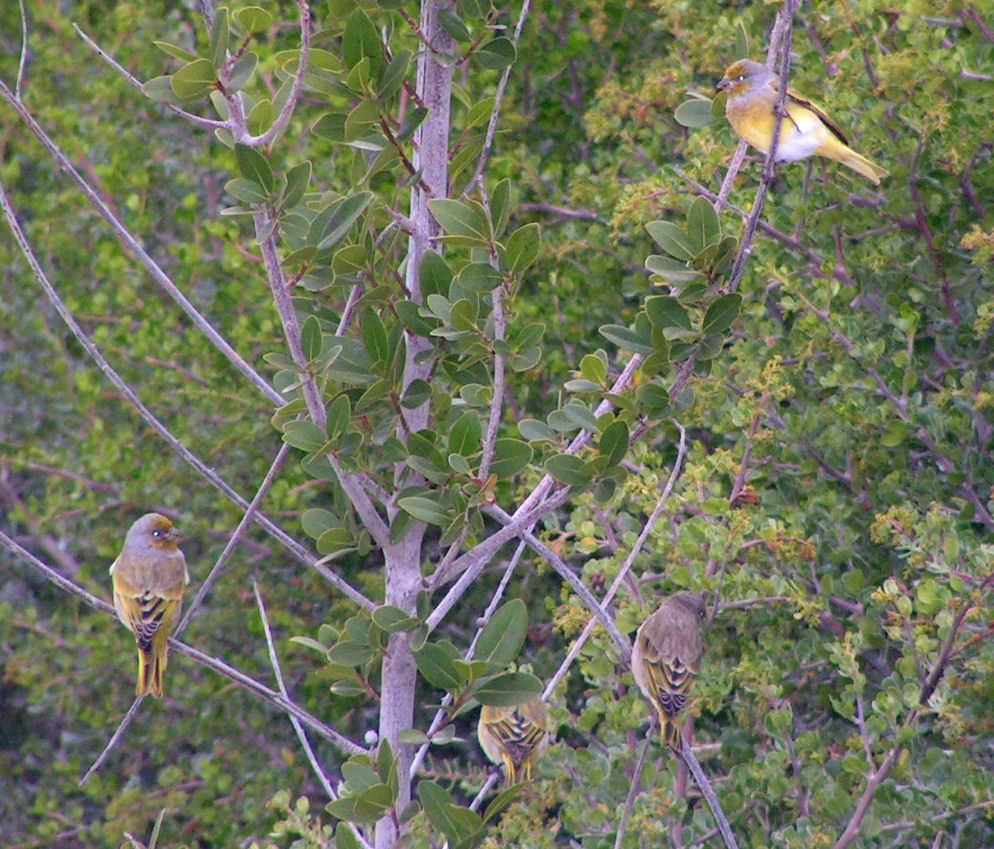
Four in a tree, South Africa
