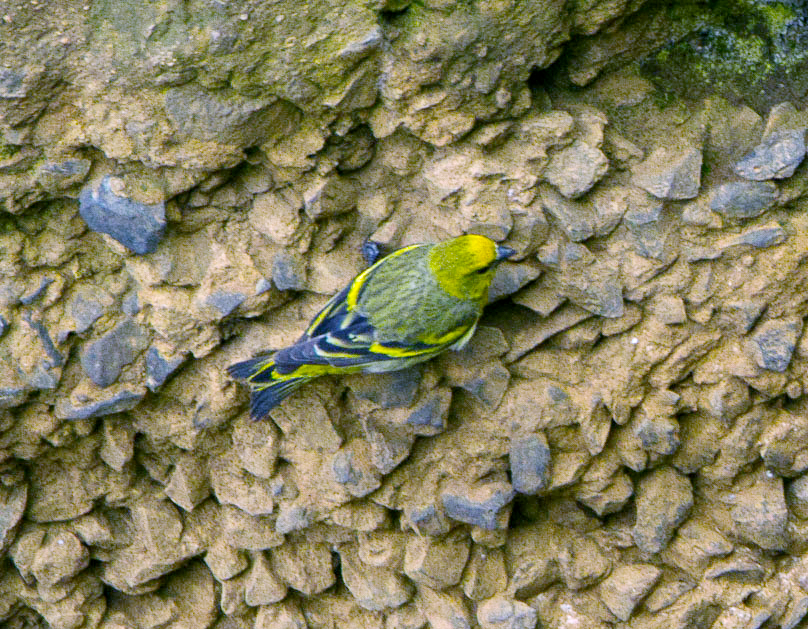

Conservation status
- Least Concern (IUCN 3.1)

Scientific classification
- Kingdom: Animalia
- Phylum: Chordata
- Class: Aves
- Order: Passeriformes
- Family: Fringillidae
- Subfamily: Carduelinae
- Genus: Serinus
- Species: S. flavivertex

Binomial name
- Serinus flavivertex (Blanford, 1869)

Synonyms
- Serinus canicollis flavivertex

= Yellow-crowned canary =

Species of bird

The yellow-crowned canary (Serinus flavivertex) is a small passerine bird in the finch family. It is a resident breeder in eastern Africa. It was formerly considered conspecific with the Cape canary (Serinus canicollis).

Its habitat is fynbos, grassland and gardens, preferably in highland areas. It builds a compact cup nest in a scrub.

The yellow-crowned canary is 11–13 cm in length. The adult male has a green back with black edging to the wings and tail. The underparts, rump and tail sides are yellow, and the lower belly is white. The head is brighter in colour than the Cape canary, yellow in colour, and the face is cinnamon. The juvenile has greenish-yellow underparts with heavy brown streaking.

The yellow-crowned canary is a common and gregarious seedeater. Its call is tsit-it-it, and the song is warbled goldfinch-like trills and whistles given in display flight or from a high perch.
