= Tsaus Mountains =

Mountain range in Namibia

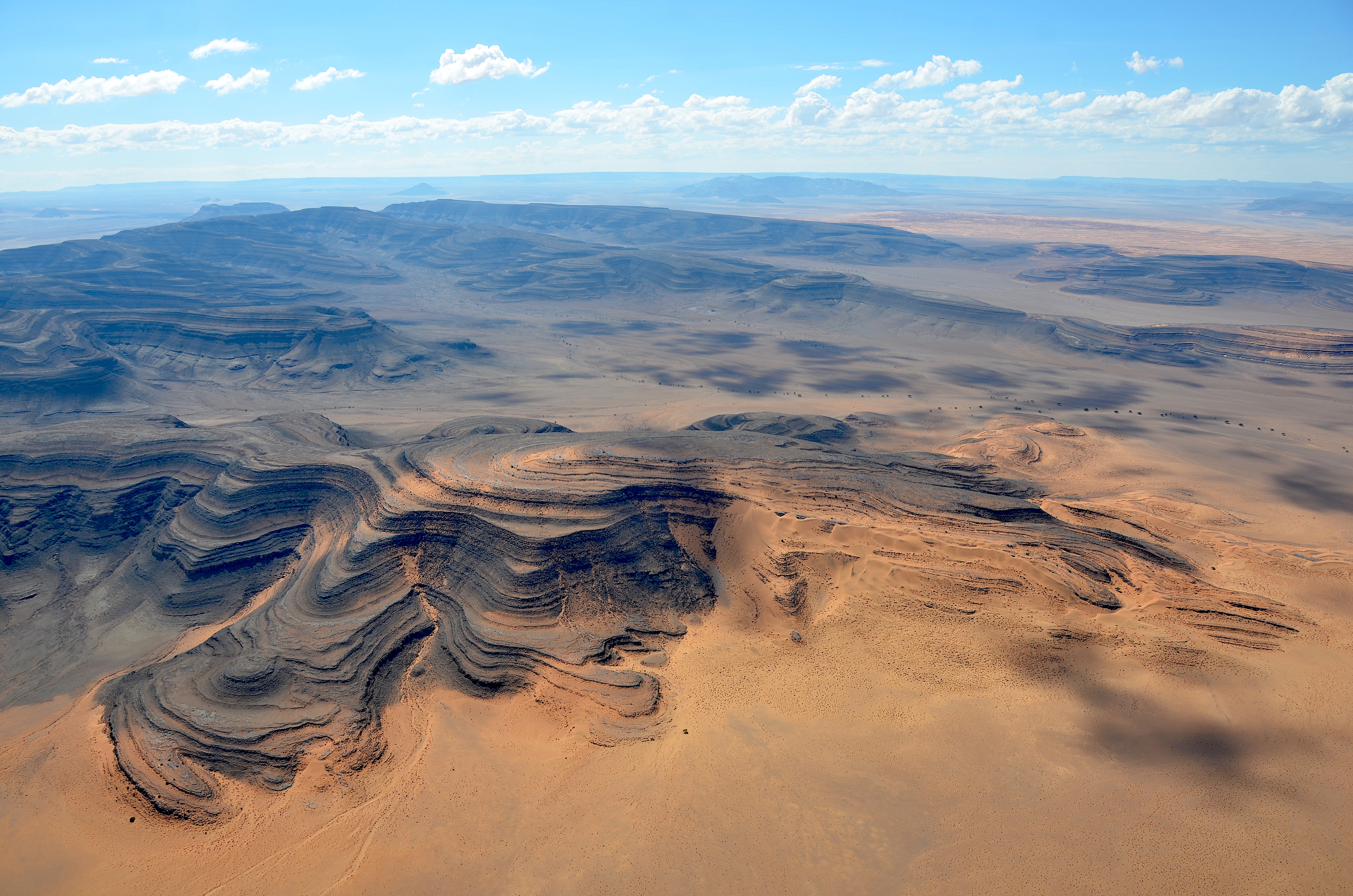
- Aerial view of Tsaus Mountains in the Diamond Restricted Area (2017)

Highest point
- Elevation: 1,107 m (3,632 ft)
- Isolation: 11 km (6.8 mi)
- Coordinates: 27°08′32″S 016°10′11″E

Geography
- Location within Namibia
- Country: Namibia
- Region: Karas

Tsaus Mountains is a mountain range within Diamond Restricted Area also called Sperrgebiet located in the southwestern part of Namibia. It reaches a height of 1,107 m.

Seen from the northern aerial view its shape looks like the Greek letter Omega ω. The Tsaus Mountains have a horizontal layered structure and its expansion is about 11 km × 11 km.

Several places of the mountain range are covered with sand which is blown over by sandstorms. The average yearly rainfall in this area of the Namib amounts to just a few millimeters.

The bushes to be found in the mountains just survive because of the mist, which sometimes is formed above the cold Atlantic and then during daytime drifts far into the desert. The few Camel Thorn trees take their water from deep underground accumulations.

On a botanical expedition in the year 1995 Steven Hammer and some comrades discovered a yet unknown type of Lithops within the Tsaus Plateau area. Because of this isolated area along the southern edge of the Tsaus Plateau they called this species Lithops hermetica.

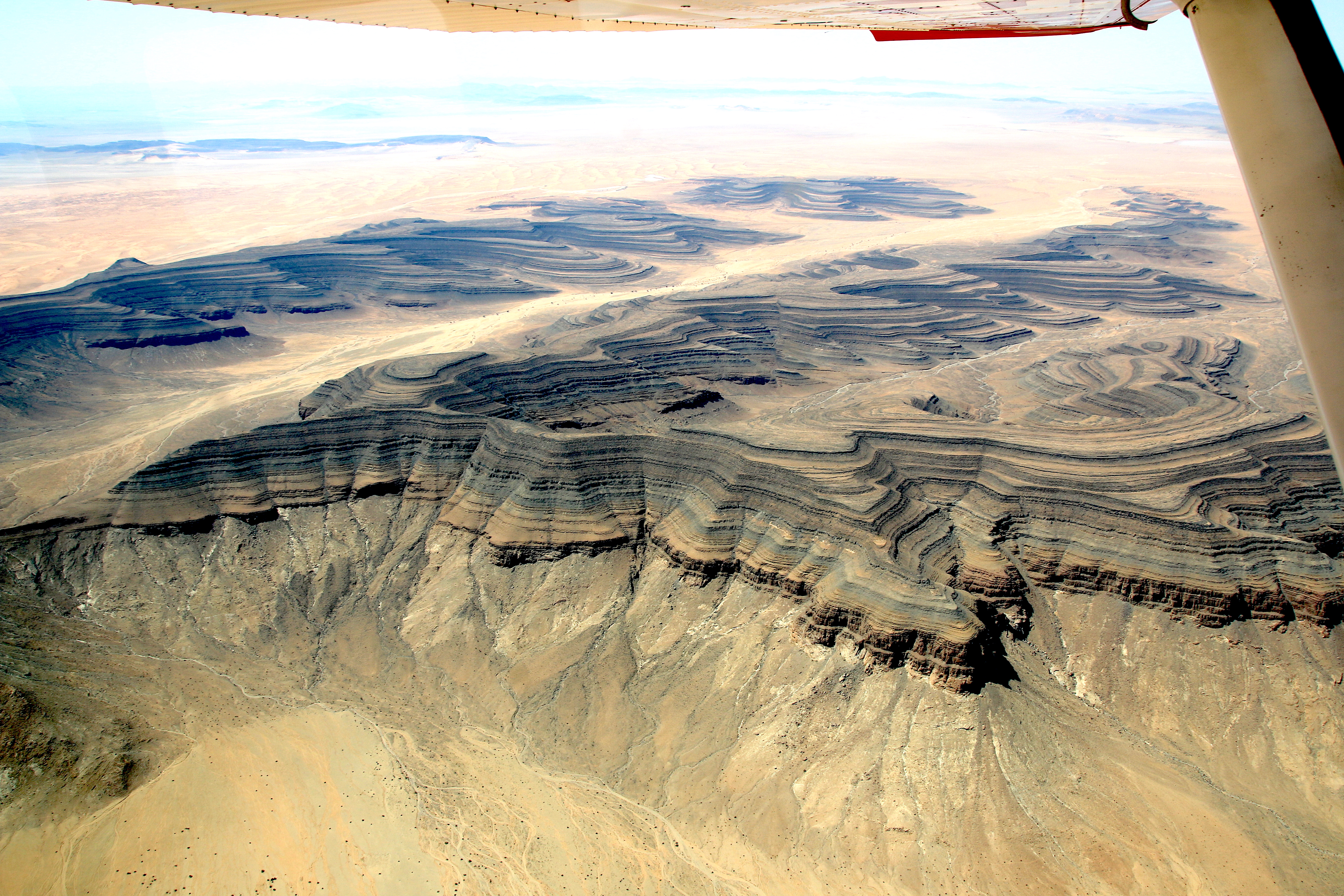
Aerial view of Tsaus mountains Direction of view southeast (2018)

== Pictures ==
Pictures of Tsaus Mountains

== Literature ==
S. Porembski, W. Barthlott (Hrsg.): Inselbergs: Biotic Diversity of Isolated Rock Outcrops in Tropical and Temperate Regions. In: Ecological Studies, Nr. 146, Springer, Berlin/Heidelberg 2000, ISBN 978-3-642-64120-6.
