= Klinghardt Mountains =

Mountain range in Namibia

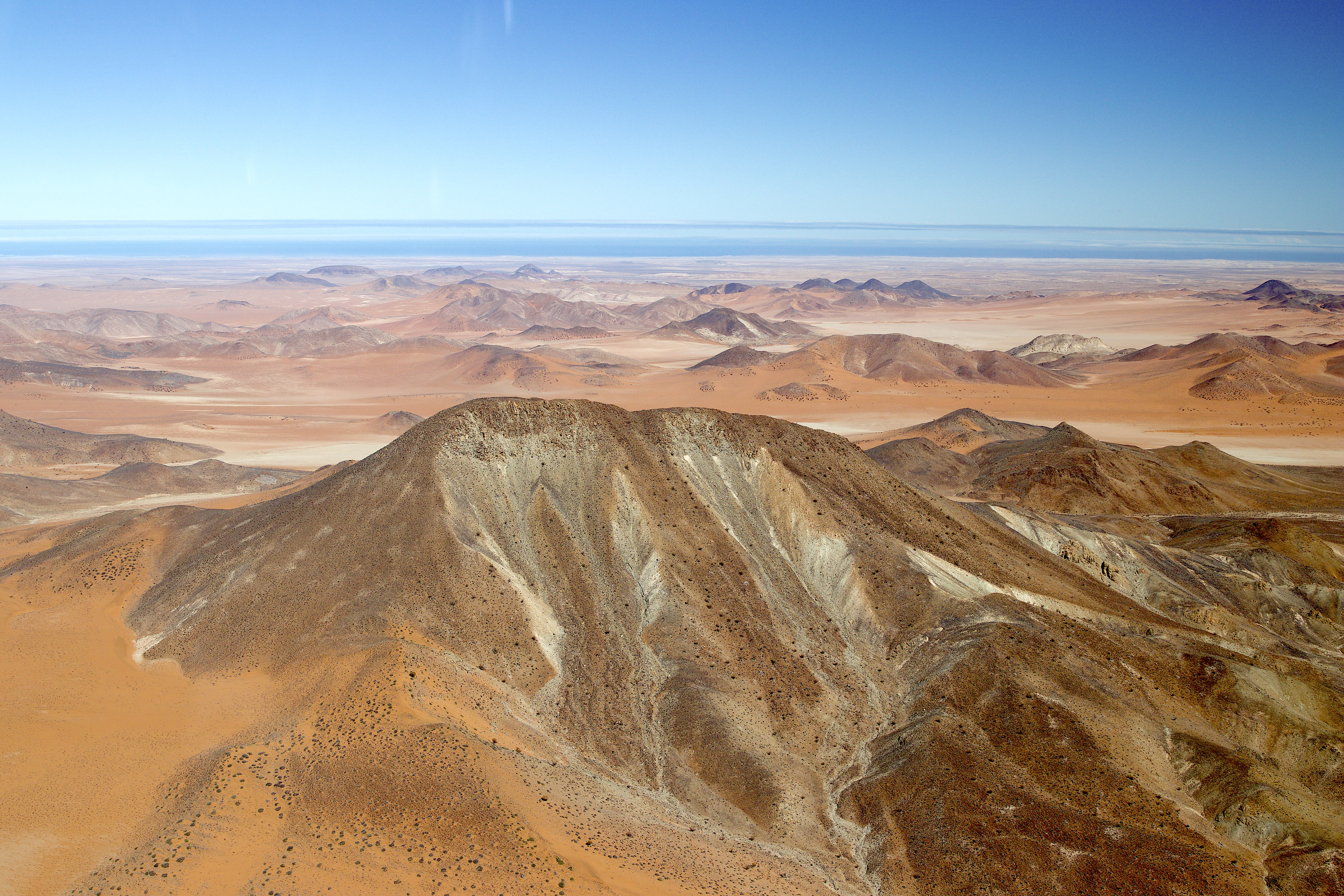
- Aerial view of Klinghardt Mountains in the Diamond Restricted Area (2018)

Highest point
- Elevation: 1,070 m (3,510 ft)
- Coordinates: 27°19′51″S 015°45′39″E

Geography
- Location within Namibia
- Country: Namibia
- Region: ǁKaras

The Klinghardt Mountains are a Namibian mountain range in the Diamond Restricted Area, also called Sperrgebiet. The Klinghardt Mountains are located approximately 90 km south-southeast of Lüderitz and extend over an area of about 350 km^{2}. East of the Klinghardt Mountains is the mountain Höchster.

Several places of the mountain range are covered with sand which is blown over by sandstorms. The average yearly rainfall in this area of the Namib desert amounts to just a few millimeters.

The bushes to be found in the mountains just survive because of the mist, which sometimes is formed above the cold Atlantic and then during daytime drifts far into the desert. The few Camel Thorn trees take their water from deep underground accumulations.

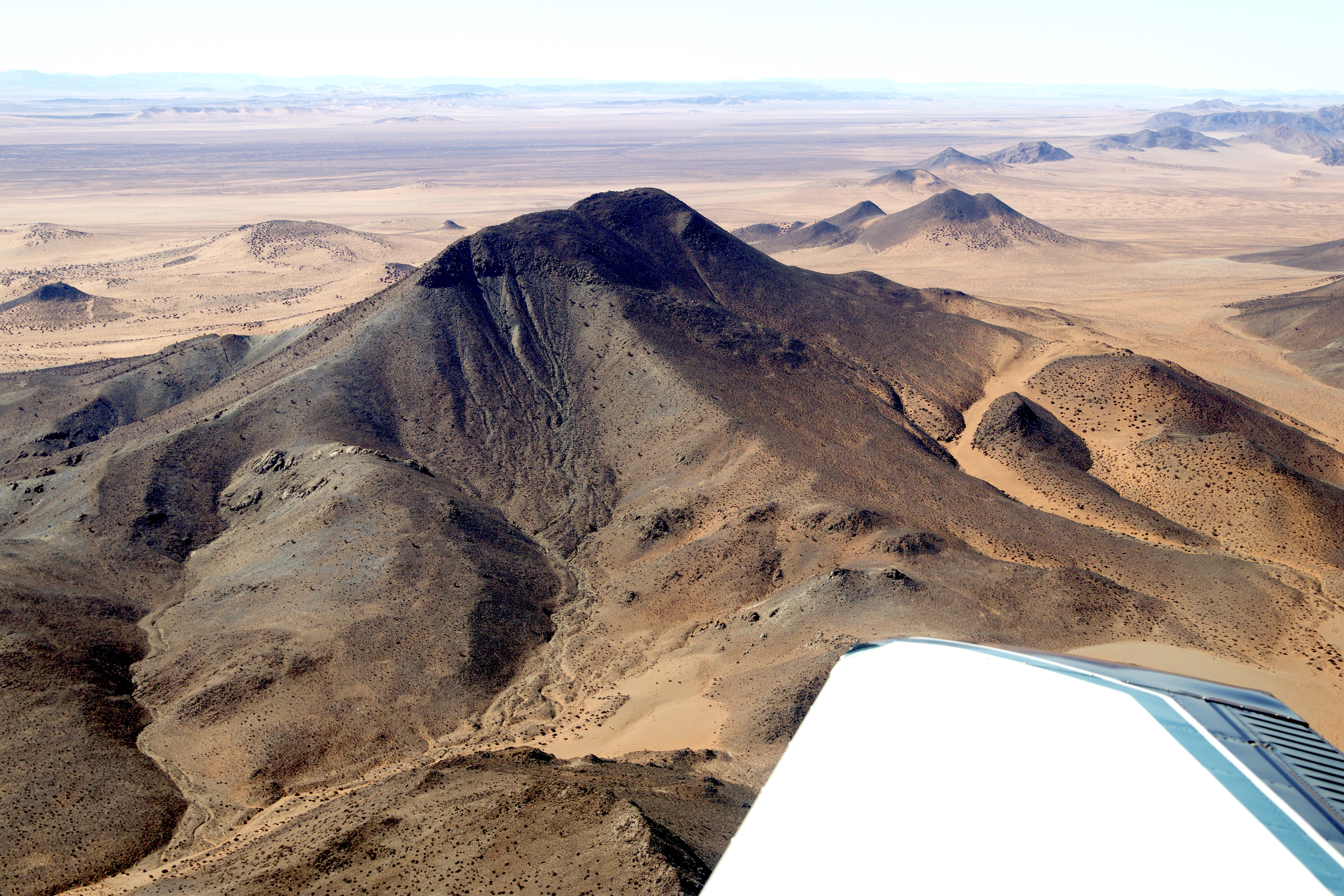
The Höchster is east of the Klinghardt Mountains (Aerial view 2018)

== Pictures ==
Pictures of Klinghardt Mountains
