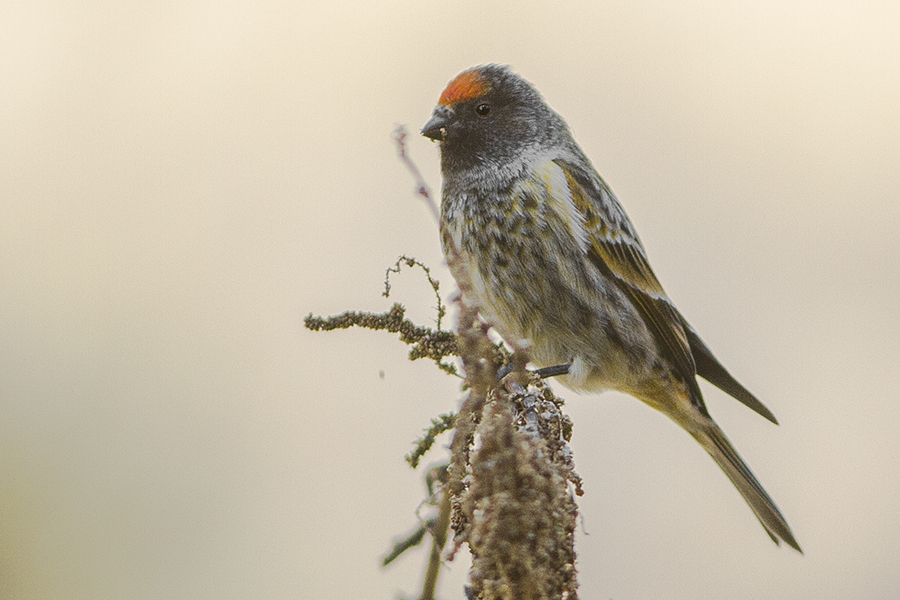
- Serinus pusillus from Nainital district of Uttarakhand, India.

Conservation status
- Least Concern (IUCN 3.1)

Scientific classification
- Kingdom: Animalia
- Phylum: Chordata
- Class: Aves
- Order: Passeriformes
- Family: Fringillidae
- Subfamily: Carduelinae
- Genus: Serinus
- Species: S. pusillus

Binomial name
- Serinus pusillus (Pallas, 1811)

= Red-fronted serin =

Species of bird

The red-fronted serin or fire-fronted serin (Serinus pusillus) is a small passerine bird in the finch family Fringillidae. It prefers high mountain regions and is 11–12 cm (4.3–4.7 in) long.

This bird breeds in the Caucasus and the higher mountains of Turkey and Iran, with vagrants occasionally reaching the Greek Eastern Aegean Islands in winter. This bird is also found in Ladakh and other parts of the Indian Himalayas. Outside the breeding season, it occurs in small flocks, typically seen searching through thistle patches. It is a popular cagebird, and escapees from captivity are occasionally found throughout Europe.

The bird is variable in plumage, with adults resembling very dark redpolls. The foreparts are sooty and the forehead is red; juveniles have buff-brown heads. The call is a rapid, shrill "titihihihihihi", resembling that of a Linnet.

The bird will breed in captivity and thrives on a diet of canary grass seed, millet, and other small seeds. They bathe daily if water is accessible.
