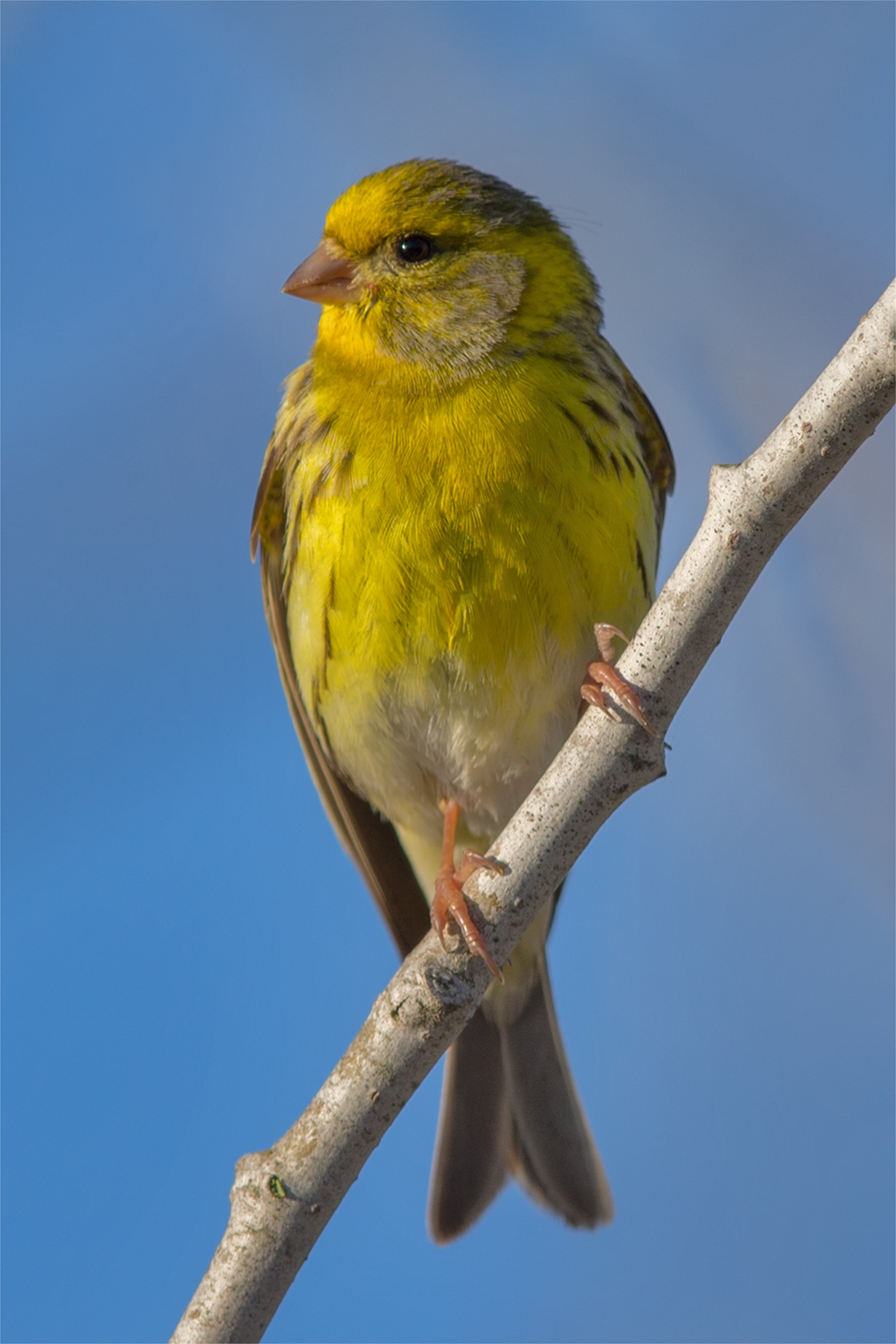
- Male European serin (Serinus serinus)

Scientific classification
- Kingdom: Animalia
- Phylum: Chordata
- Class: Aves
- Order: Passeriformes
- Family: Fringillidae
- Subfamily: Carduelinae
- Genus: Serinus; Koch, 1816

Type species
- Serinus hortulanus Koch, 1816=Fringilus serinus Linnaeus, 1758

Species
- See text.

= Serinus =

Genus of birds

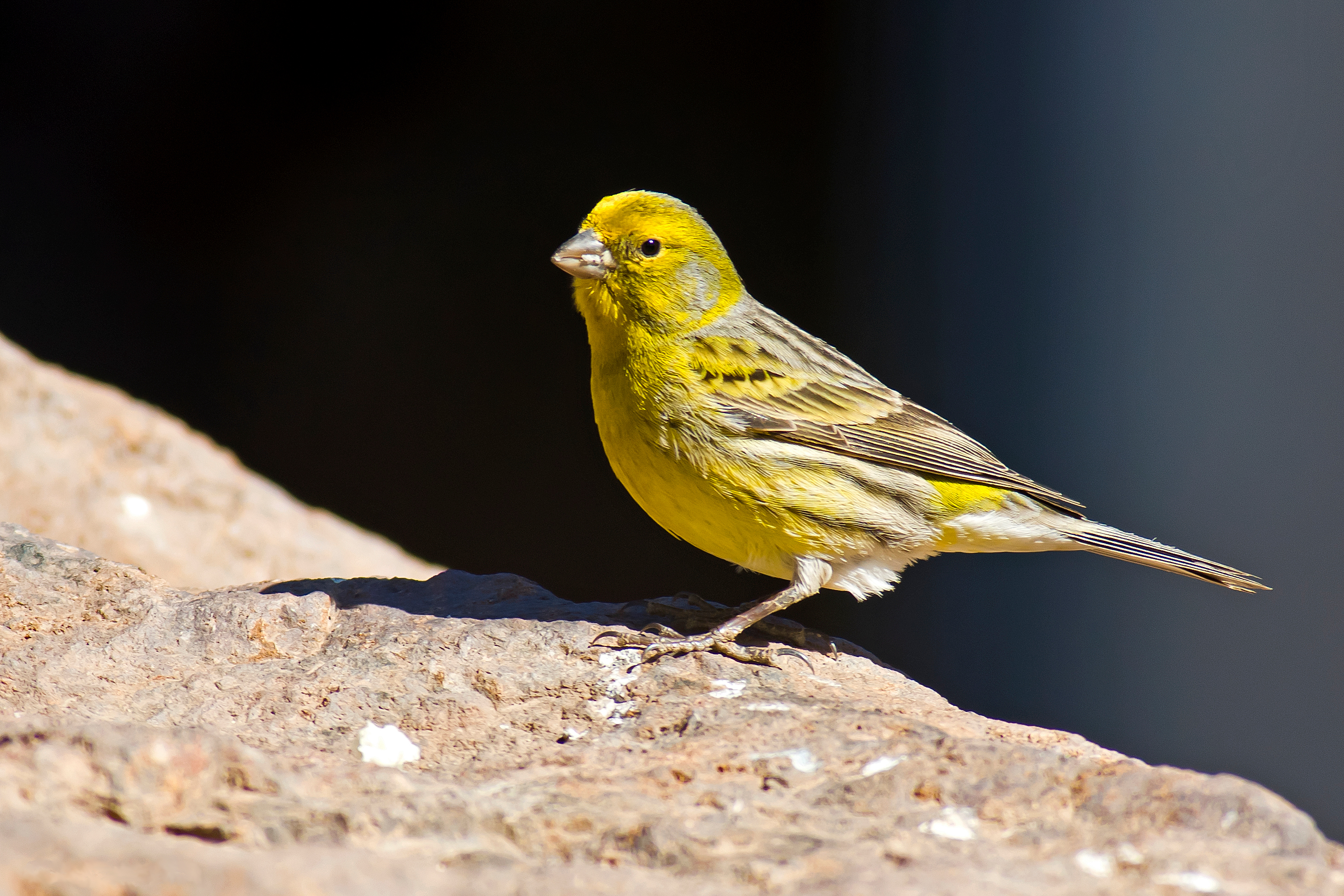
A male Atlantic Canary in Parque Rural del Nublo, Gran Canaria, Spain.

Serinus is a genus of small birds in the finch family Fringillidae found in West Asia, Europe and Africa. The birds usually have some yellow in their plumage.

== Taxonomy ==
The genus Serinus was introduced in 1816 by the German naturalist Carl Ludwig Koch to accommodate a single species, Serinus hortulanus Koch. This is a junior synonym of Fringilus serinus Linnaeus, the European serin and becomes the type species by monotypy. The genus name is Neo-Latin for "canary-yellow".

Many species were at one time assigned to the genus but it became clear from phylogenetic studies of mitochondrial and nuclear DNA sequences that the genus was polyphyletic. This was confirmed by Dario Zuccon and coworkers in a comprehensive study of the finch family published in 2012. The authors suggested splitting the genus into two monophyletic groups, a proposal that was accepted by the International Ornithologists' Union. The genus Serinus was restricted to the European serin and seven other species while a larger clade from Africa and Arabia was assigned to the resurrected genus Crithagra.

The genus contains the following eight species:

Image	Scientific name	Common name	Distribution
	Serinus pusillus	Red-fronted serin	Alpide belt from Anatolia to western Himalayas
	Serinus serinus	European serin	southern and central Europe and North Africa
	Serinus syriacus	Syrian serin	Syria, Lebanon, Palestine, Jordan and Saudi Arabia
	Serinus canaria	Atlantic canary	the Canary Islands, the Azores, and Madeira
	Serinus canicollis	Cape canary	southern Africa
	Serinus flavivertex	Yellow-crowned canary	eastern Africa and Angola
	Serinus nigriceps	Ethiopian siskin	Ethiopia
	Serinus alario	Black-headed canary	Lesotho, Namibia and South Africa
