= Höchster =

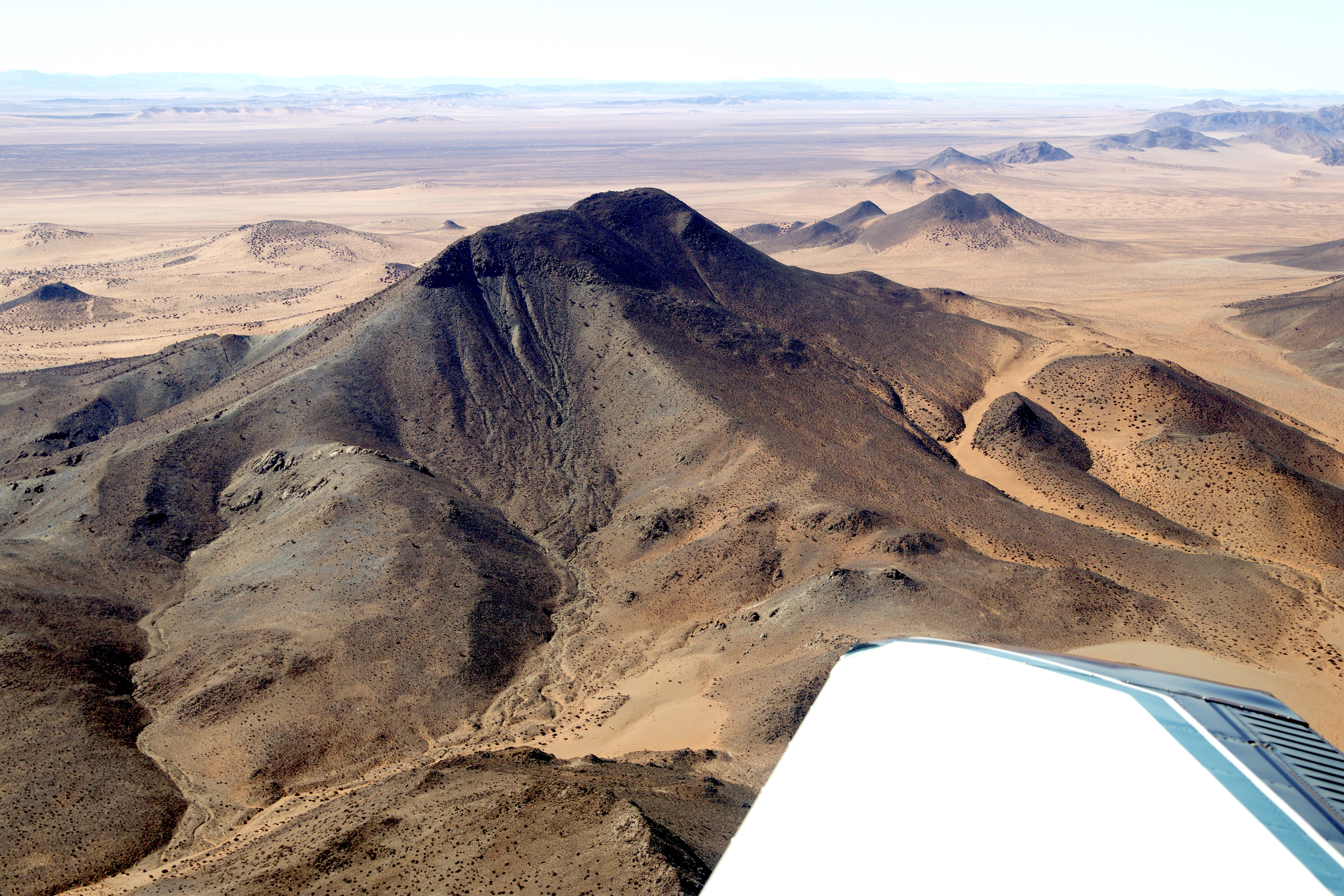
- Aerial view of Höchster in the Diamond Restricted Area (2018)

Highest point
- Elevation: 1,070 m (3,510 ft)
- Coordinates: 27°18′24″S 015°49′27″E

Geography
- Location within Namibia
- Country: Namibia
- Region: Karas

Höchster ("The Highest") is a mountain in the Diamond Restricted Area, also called Sperrgebiet, in the southwestern part of Namibia. It reaches a height of 1,070 m. Its expansion is about 5 km × 4 km.

West of Höchster are the Klinghardt Mountains.

Several places of the mountain range are covered with sand which is blown over by sandstorms. The average yearly rainfall in this area of the Namib amounts to just a few millimeters.

The bushes to be found in the mountains just survive because of the mist, which sometimes is formed above the cold Atlantic and then during daytime drifts far into the desert. The few Camel Thorn trees take their water from deep underground accumulations.

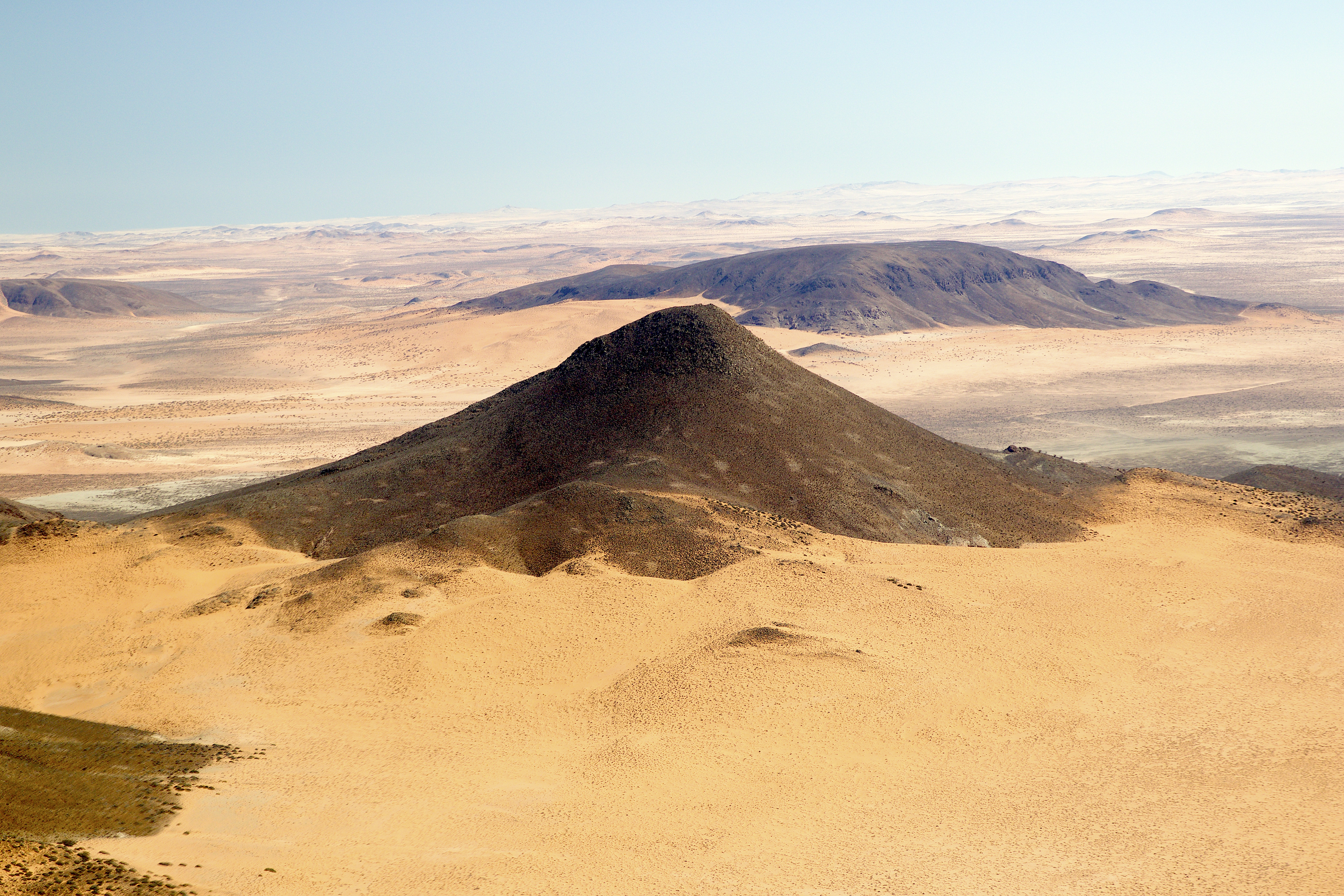
Aerial view of Höchster in the Diamond Restricted Aerea (2018). Direction of view northwest
