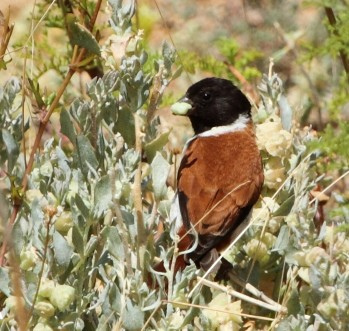
- Male in Northern Cape, South Africa
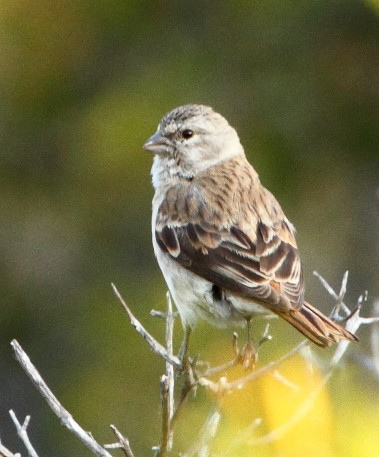
- Female in Namaqua National Park, South Africa

Conservation status
- Least Concern (IUCN 3.1)

Scientific classification
- Kingdom: Animalia
- Phylum: Chordata
- Class: Aves
- Order: Passeriformes
- Family: Fringillidae
- Subfamily: Carduelinae
- Genus: Serinus
- Species: S. alario

Binomial name
- Serinus alario (Linnaeus, 1758)
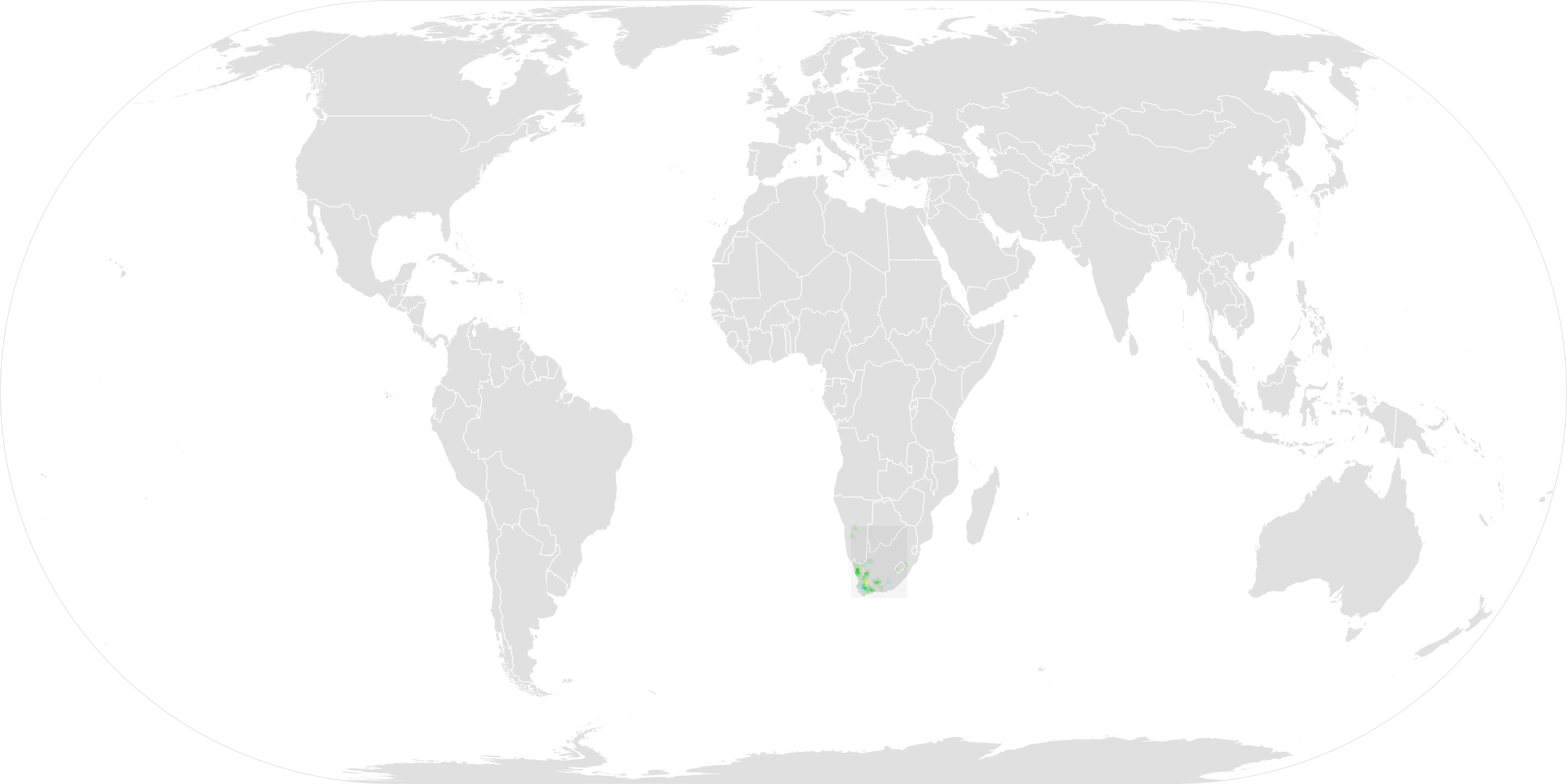
- Global range Year-Round Range Summer Range Winter Range

Synonyms
- Emberiza alario Linnaeus, 1758; Fringilla alario Linnaeus, 1766; Crithagra alario (Linnaeus, 1758)

= Black-headed canary =

Species of bird

The black-headed canary (Serinus alario) is a species of finch found in Lesotho, Namibia and South Africa. It is sometimes placed in the genus Alario as Alario alario

Its habitat is dry open scrub and grassland, the edges of cultivation and suburban gardens.

== Description ==
The black-headed canary is 12–15 cm in length. The adult male has rich brown upper parts and tail, a white hind collar, and mainly white underparts. The head and central breast are solidly black.

The adult female is similar, but has a dull grey head, and is dark-streaked on the head and upper parts. It has a rich brown wing bar. The juvenile resembles the female, but is paler and has streaking on the breast and a weaker wing bar.

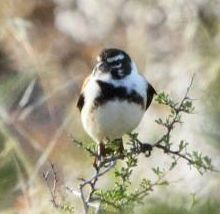
Male Damara canary

The Damara canary (Serinus leucolaema) is often considered to be a subspecies of the black-headed canary. The male of that form has a strikingly different head pattern, with a white supercilium, and a white throat and foreneck with a black moustachial stripe. The black of the central breast is therefore separate from the black of the head.

== Behaviour ==
The Damara canary is a common and gregarious seed-eater, forming flocks of up to 200 birds. Its call is a low tseett, and the male's song is a jumble of unmusical notes.
