= Pomona, Namibia =

Pomona
- Ghost town
- Location in Namibia
- Coordinates: 27°12′S 15°17′E
- Country: Namibia
- Region: ǁKaras Region
- Constituency: Lüderitz Constituency

Population
  - Total: 0
- Time zone: UTC+1 (South African Standard Time)

Pomona is a ghost town in southern Namibia south of Lüderitz on the coast of the Atlantic Ocean. It is about 15 km south of Elizabeth Bay, Namibia, in an area called Sperrgebiet, a diamond mining zone with restricted access.

Around 1910, at the time of the diamond rush in German South West Africa, diamonds in the Pomona area were so plentiful that they could be picked up from the ground with bare hands. Pomona boasted the richest diamond mine of its time, generating over 1,000,000 carats (200 kg) between 1912 and 1914.

== History ==
Mining in the Pomona area started in the 1860s. After the discovery of guano deposits, the British annexed a number of islands off the coast of south-western Africa. This action led adventurers and traders into the area. Two of these, Aaron de Pass and Captain John Spence, obtained mining rights from Chief David Christian along the coast between the shore and 15°50’ longitude. Together they established the Pomona Mining Company and unsuccessfully tried to extract copper, lead and silver. It later appeared they must have shoveled the diamonds away to get access to the ore deposits.

After the first diamond was found in April 1908 by August Stauch near Grasplatz station, a diamond rush was triggered in German South West Africa. As prospectors moved southwards, Stauch and Professor Robert Scheibe from the Royal Mining Academy of Berlin discovered rich alluvial deposits in this area, leading to the establishment of a mining settlement which was originally called Pomonapforte (Pomona port), as it was placed at the entrance point to several valleys, all of which have been named after the two prospectors and their immediate families: Idatal (Ida's valley), after Stauch's wife Ida, Barbaratal and Mariannental, after Stauch's daughters, Stauchlager (Stauch's settlement), and Scheibetal (Scheibe's valley).

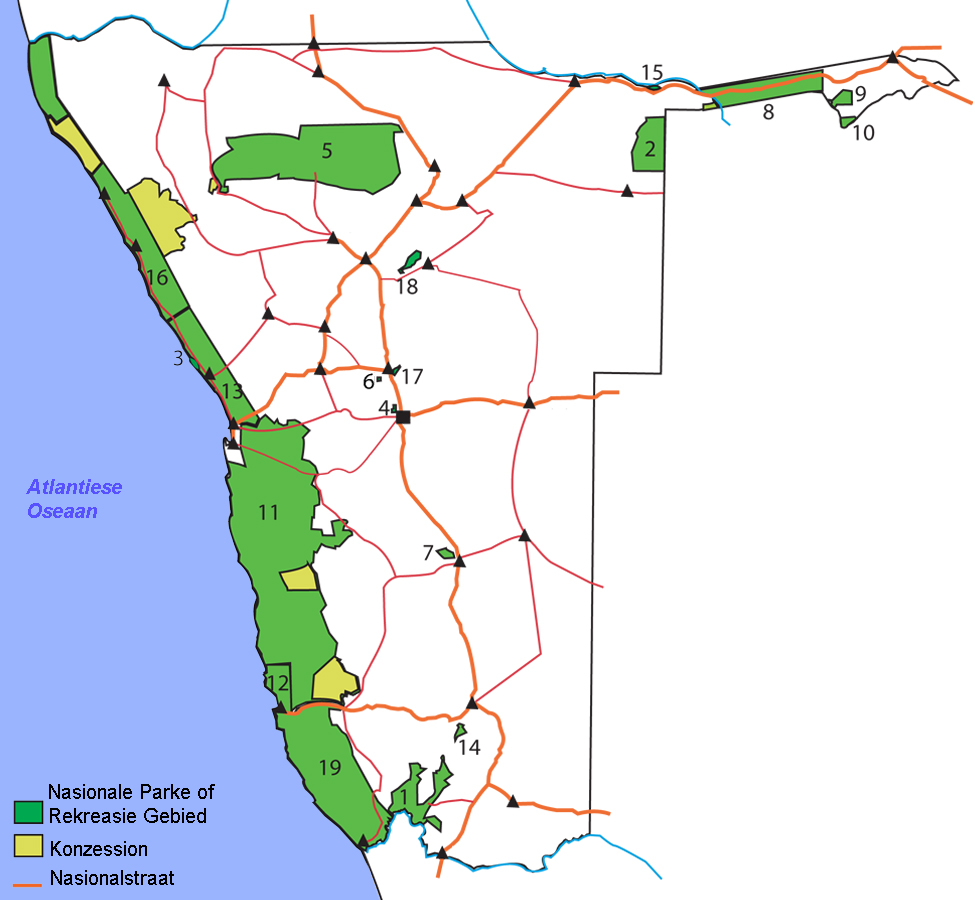
Location of the Sperrgebiet in today's Namibia (#19)

The older mining rights held by the Pomona Mining Company were both a blessing and a curse. The German Government of the time started protecting the area only six months after the diamond discoveries, declaring the Sperrgebiet (forbidden zone), a gigantic strip of land 100 km wide, and ranging from 45 km north of Lüderitz all the way to the Orange River. The mining rights for this area reverted to Deutsche Diamantengesellschaft (German Diamond Corporation) but excluded existing claims and the older rights of de Pass and Spence. Therefore, the Pomona area was the only place to set up new claims, and after extensive legal struggle official diamond mining started in 1912 under the auspices of the Pomona Diamanten Gesellschaft (Pomona Diamond Corporation). This mine soon extracted an average of 50,000 carats (10,000 g) per month.

A private narrow-gauge electrified railway was established to serve the diamond mining industry. It ran 119 kilometres (74 mi) between Kolmanskop and Bogenfels via Pomona. It was powered by a 1.5 megawatts (2,000 hp) power station in Lüderitz and was completed in 1913 but destroyed in World War I in 1915 by South African troops.

The First World War ended all individual mining activities; South Africa soon defeated Germany on South West African terrain and took over the Sperrgebiet. De Beers became the owner of the mines; it kept control of the area until the 1990s, when the Namibian government purchased a fifty percent stake, forming a joint partnership called the Namdeb Diamond Corporation.

== Gallery ==
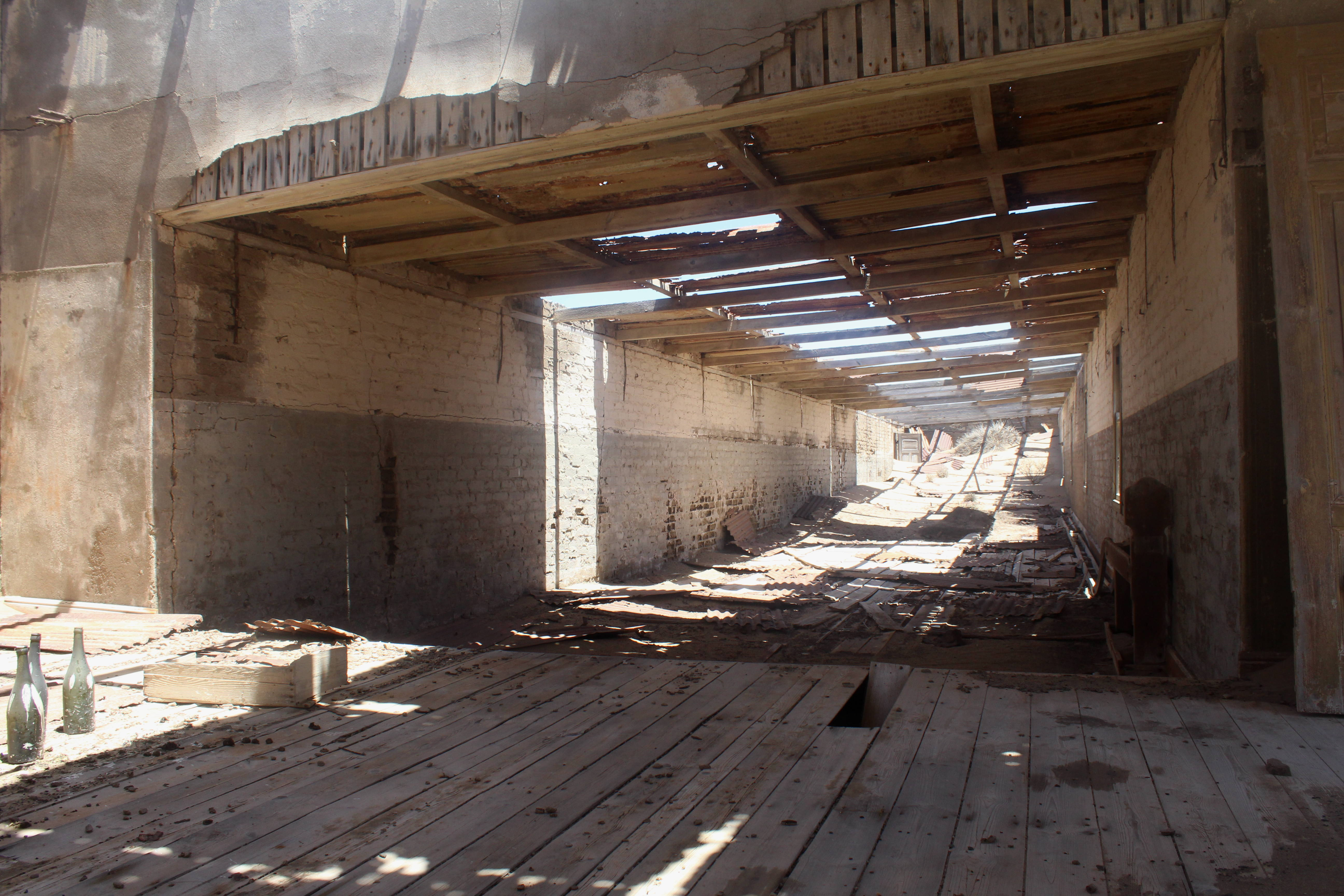
The old bowling alley in Pomona

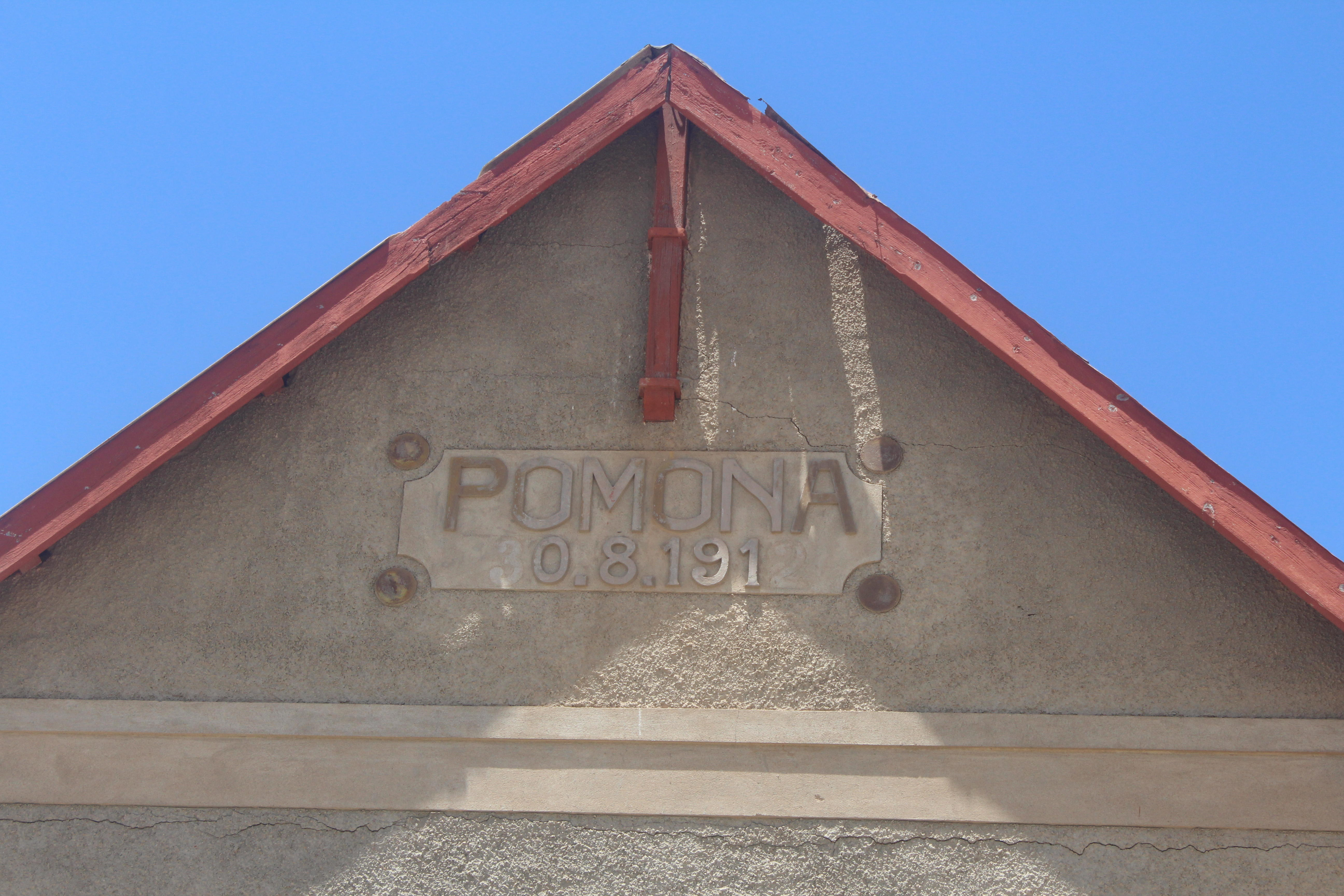
Date on one of the facades in Pomona

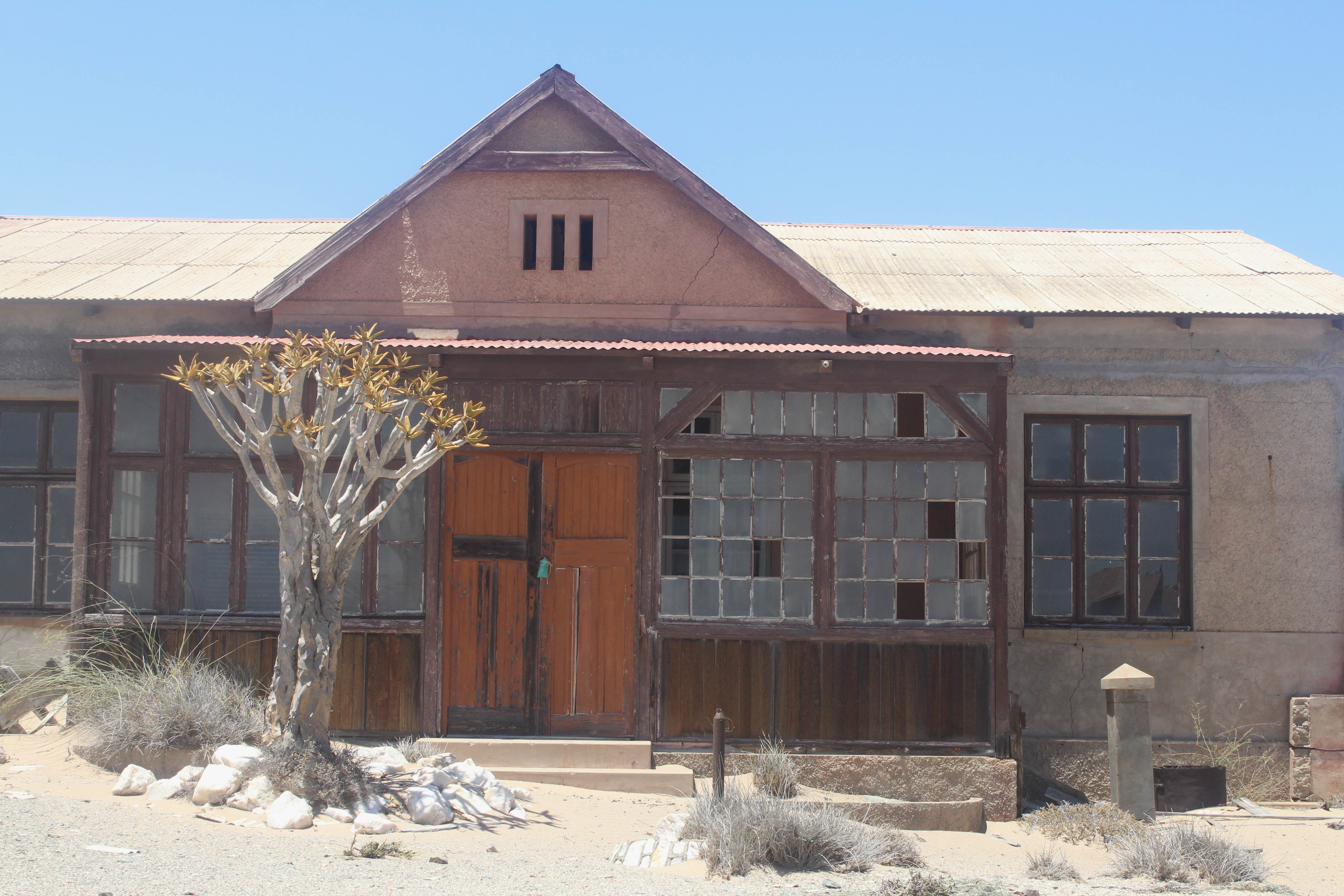
A partially restored building still in use by mine personnel

== See also ==
- Kolmanskop
- Elizabeth Bay
