= Elizabeth Bay =

Elizabeth Bay may refer to:

- Elizabeth Bay, New South Wales, a harbourside suburb in eastern Sydney, New South Wales, Australia
- Elisabeth Bay, Isabela Island (Ecuador), a natural bay on the coast of Isabela Island, Galapagos.
- Elizabeth Bay, Namibia (formerly Elisabethbucht) is a ghost town in southern Namibia.

== See also ==
- Elizabeth Bay House, a historic home in the suburb of Elizabeth Bay, Sydney Australia.
