= Kolmanskop =

Ghost town in Namibia

- Town
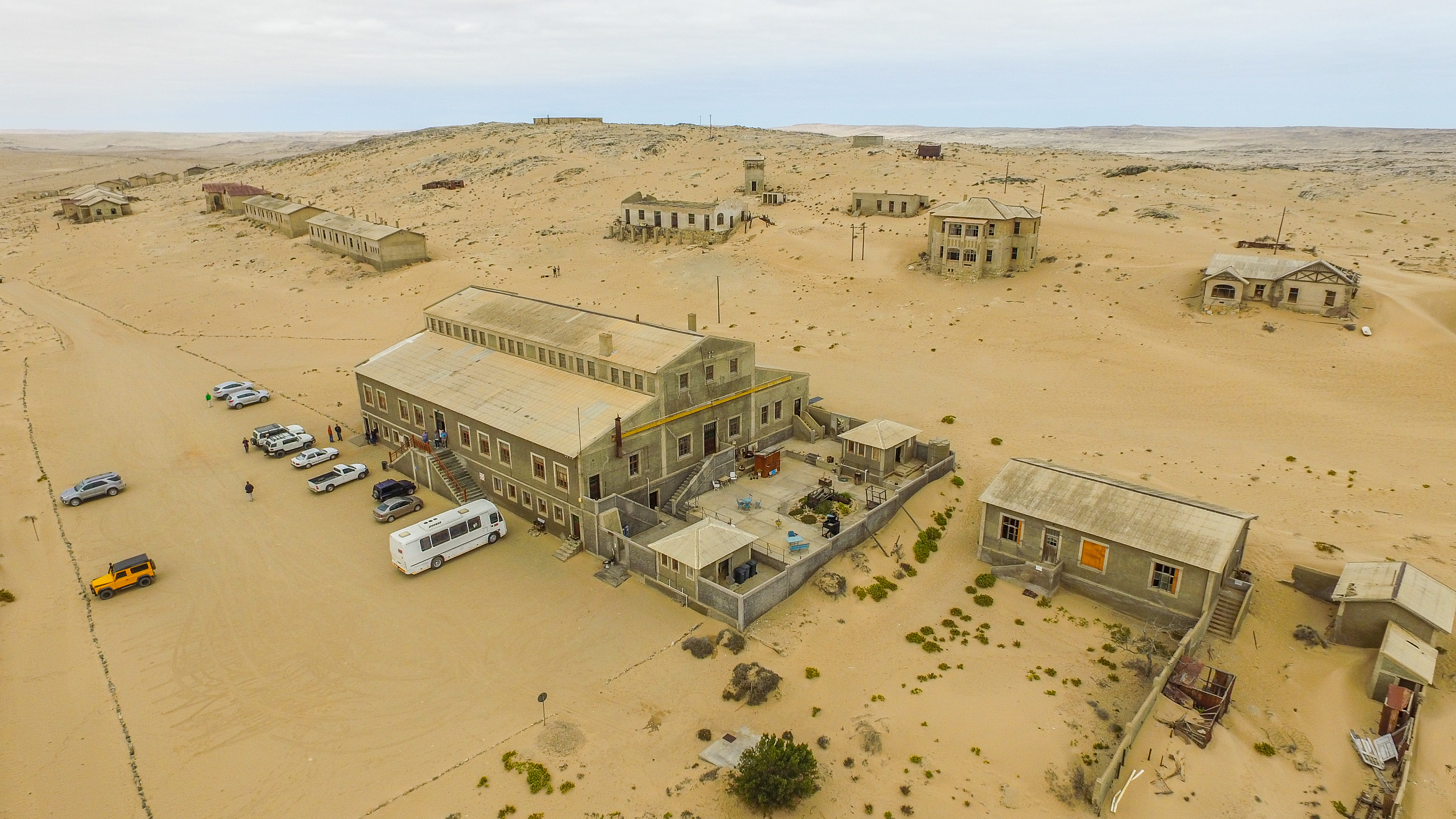
- An aerial view of Kolmanskop

- Location in Namibia
- Coordinates: 26.70406°S 15.232365°E
- Country: Namibia
- Region: ǁKaras Region

Population (2024)
  - Total: 0

Kolmanskop (Afrikaans for "Coleman's peak", German: Kolmannskuppe) is a ghost town in the Namib in southern Namibia, 10 kilometres (6.2 mi) inland from the port town of Lüderitz. It was named after a transport driver named Johnny Coleman who, during a sand storm, abandoned his ox wagon on a small incline opposite the settlement. Once a small but very rich mining village, it is now a popular tourist destination run by Namdeb, a joint firm owned by the Namibian government and De Beers.

== History ==
=== Foundation and peak ===
In 1908, in what was then German South-West Africa, a railroad worker Zacharias Lewala found a diamond while working in this area and showed it to his supervisor, the German railway inspector August Stauch. Realizing the area was rich in diamonds, German miners settled, and soon after the German Empire declared a large area as a "Sperrgebiet" (German, meaning "prohibited area"), starting to exploit the diamond field.

During a diamond boom in 1910, Kolmanskop became one of the richest towns in Africa. From 1911 onwards it had electric power and luxurious stone houses, along with a theatre, ice factory, casino, school, hospital, ballroom, and sport hall.

Kolmanskop had a railway link to Lüderitz and was also the terminus of two private narrow-gauge electrified railway lines that served the diamond mining industry further south. One ran 119 kilometres (74 mi) via Pomona to Bogenfels. It was completed in 1913 but destroyed during World War I in 1915 by South African troops. The other railway line, 7 kilometres (4.3 mi) long and completed in 1920, led to Charlottental. Both were powered by a 1.5 megawatts (2,000 hp) power station in Lüderitz, then assumed to be the largest in Africa.

=== Decline ===
The town started to decline during World War I when the diamond field slowly started to deplete. By the early 1920s, the area was in a severe decline. Hastening the town's demise was the discovery in 1928 of the richest diamond-bearing deposits ever known, on the beach terraces 270 kilometres (170 mi) south of Kolmanskop, near the Orange River. Many of the town's inhabitants joined the rush to the south, leaving their homes and possessions behind. The new diamond find merely required scouting the beaches as opposed to more difficult mining. The town was ultimately abandoned in 1956. The geological forces of the desert mean that tourists now walk through houses knee-deep in sand. Kolmanskop is popular with photographers for its settings of the desert sands reclaiming this once-thriving town, and the arid climate preserving the traditional Edwardian architecture in the area. Due to its location within the restricted area (Sperrgebiet) of the Namib desert, tourists need a permit to enter the town.

A population of rare brown hyenas uses the town's deteriorating infrastructure for shelter.

== In popular culture ==
- Kolmanskop was featured on the series Mysteries of the Abandoned episode entitled "Animal Uprising", that first aired on 18 October 2020 on the Animal Planet Channel.
- Kolmanskop was used as the location for the South African TV film The Mantis Project (1987). Directed by Manie van Rensburg, produced by Paul Kemp, written by John Cundill, and starring Marius Weyers and Sandra Prinsloo.
- Kolmanskop was a filming location for the 1990 South African adventure film The Sandgrass People.
- The town was used as one of the locations in the 1993 film Dust Devil.
- The 2000 film The King Is Alive was filmed in Kolmanskop, with the town used as the film's main setting.
- The town was featured in a 2010 episode of Life After People. The episode focused on the effects of wind and sand on the various run-down buildings and displayed rooms that were filled with sand.
- The town was used as one of the locations in the 1994 film Lunarcop.
- The town was used in the first episode of the BBC series Wonders of the Universe to help explain entropy and its effect on time.
- The television series Destination Truth in one of its episodes investigated Kolmanskop, rumored to be haunted.
- Tim Walker photographed Agyness Deyn in Kolmanskop, Namibia for Vogue UK in May 2011.
- The 2011 non-narrative film Samsara features shots filmed in Kolmanskop.
- The town featured in 2011 on season 1, episode 2 "Namibia/Bodie" of the television show Forgotten Planet.
- The cover of Tame Impala's fourth album, The Slow Rush and its singles were photographed at Kolmanskop by Neil Krug.
- The music video for George Watsky's "Undermine" from the Placement album was filmed in Kolmanskop.
- Parts of the 2024 TV series Fallout were filmed in the area.

== Literature ==
- Noli, Gino: Desert Diamonds. Gino Noli, Plettenberg Bay 2010, ISBN 978-0-620-40680-2.

== Gallery ==
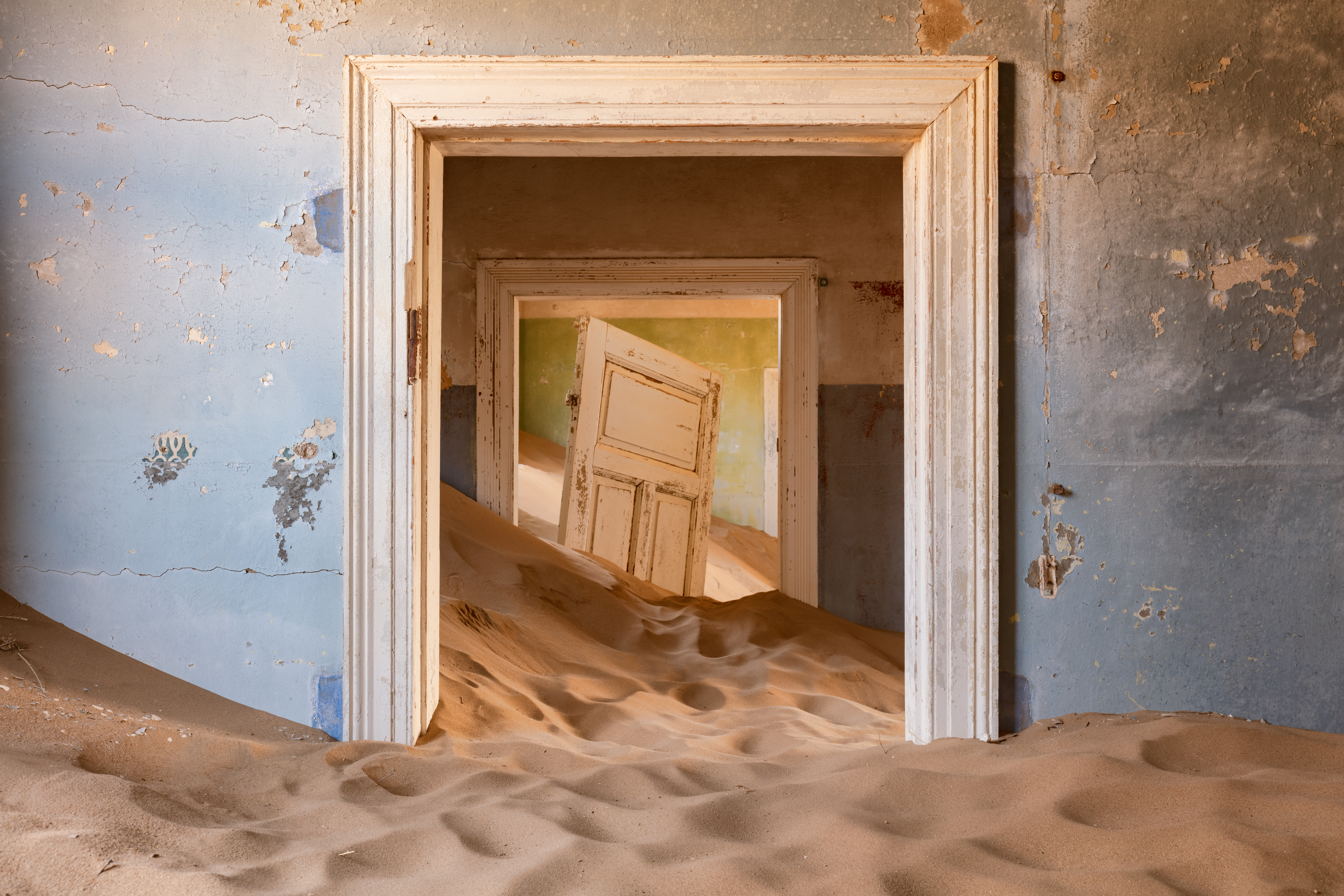
An abandoned building

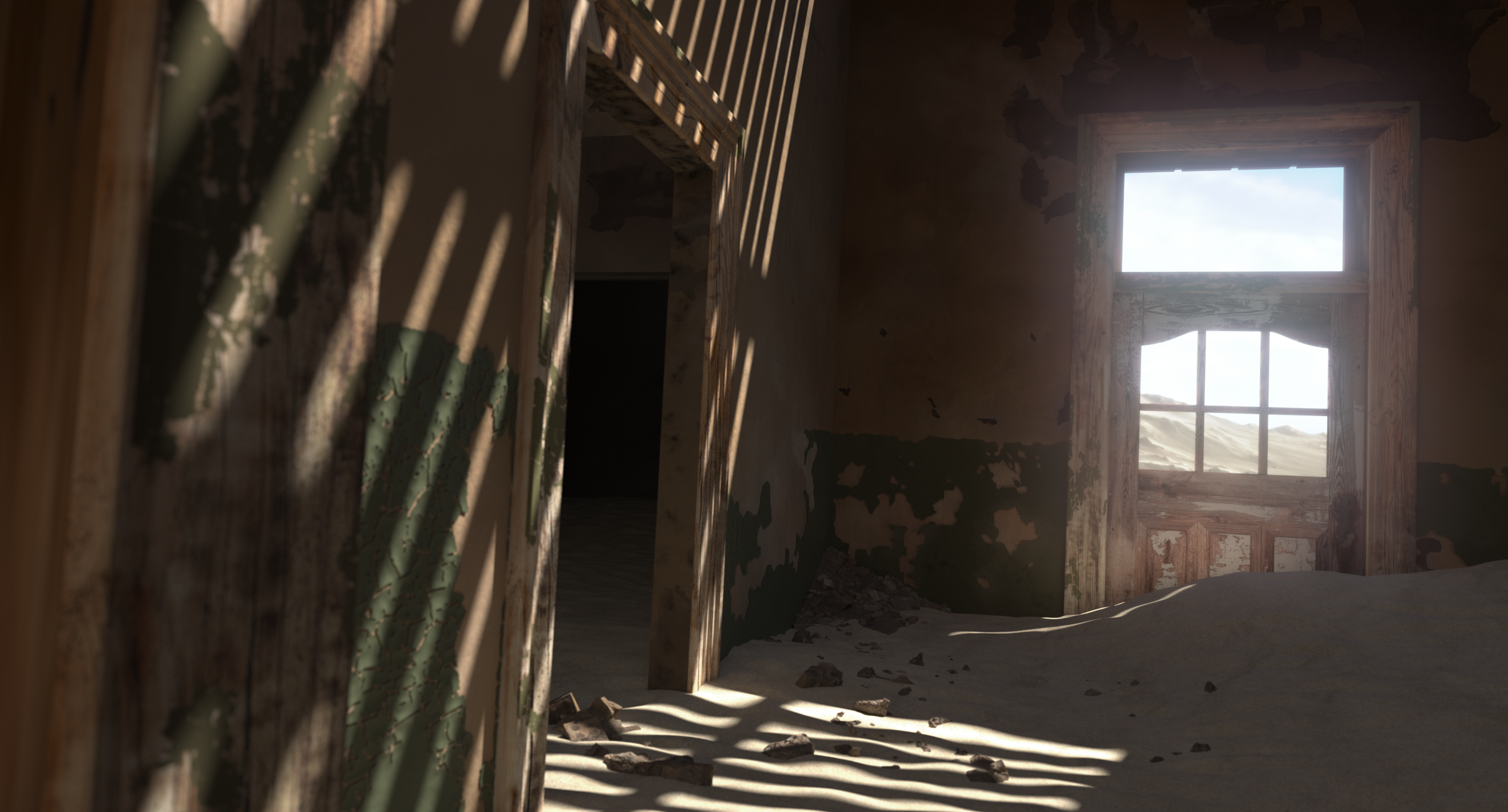
Interior of an abandoned house

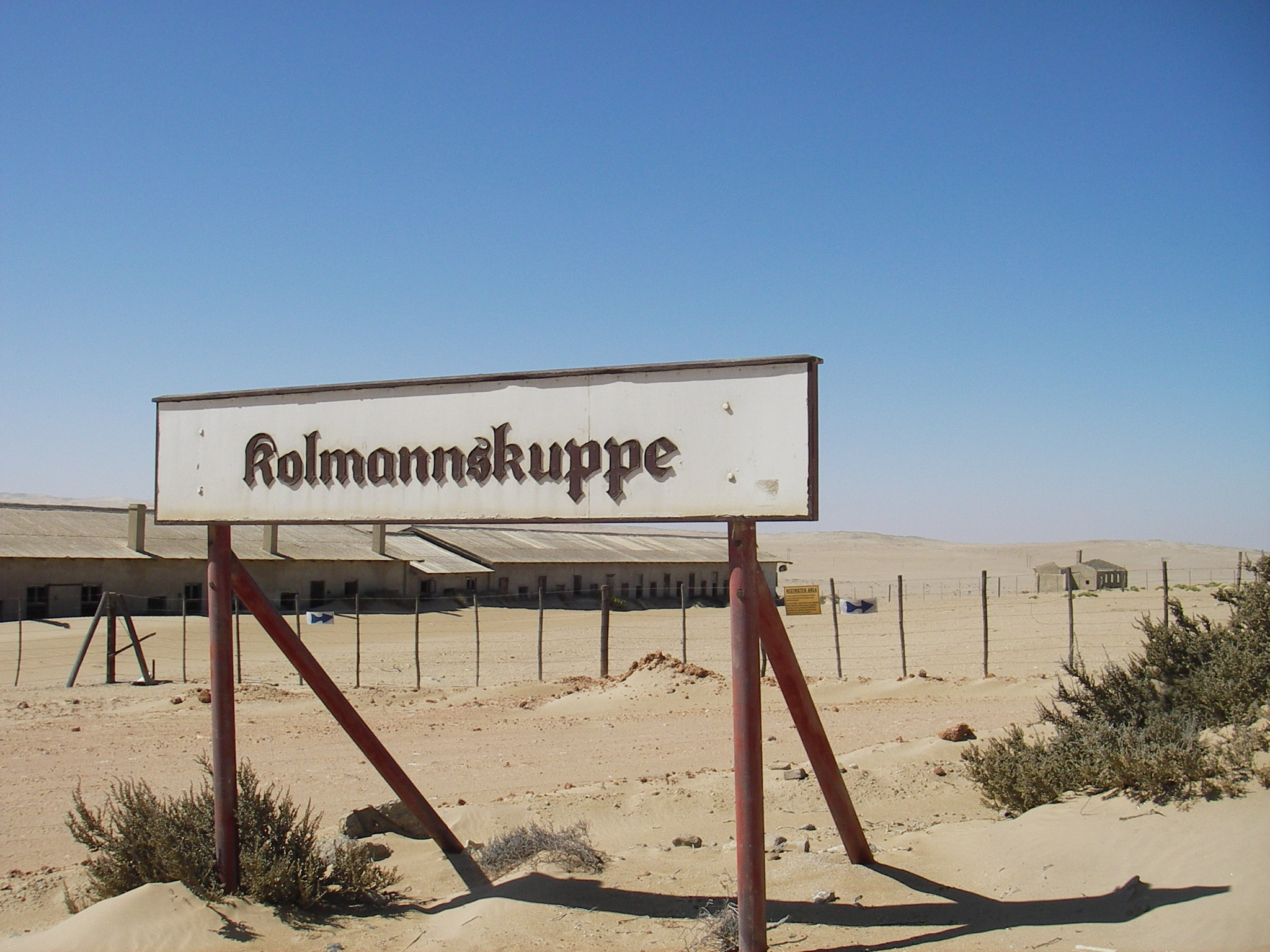
The town sign of Kolmannskuppe

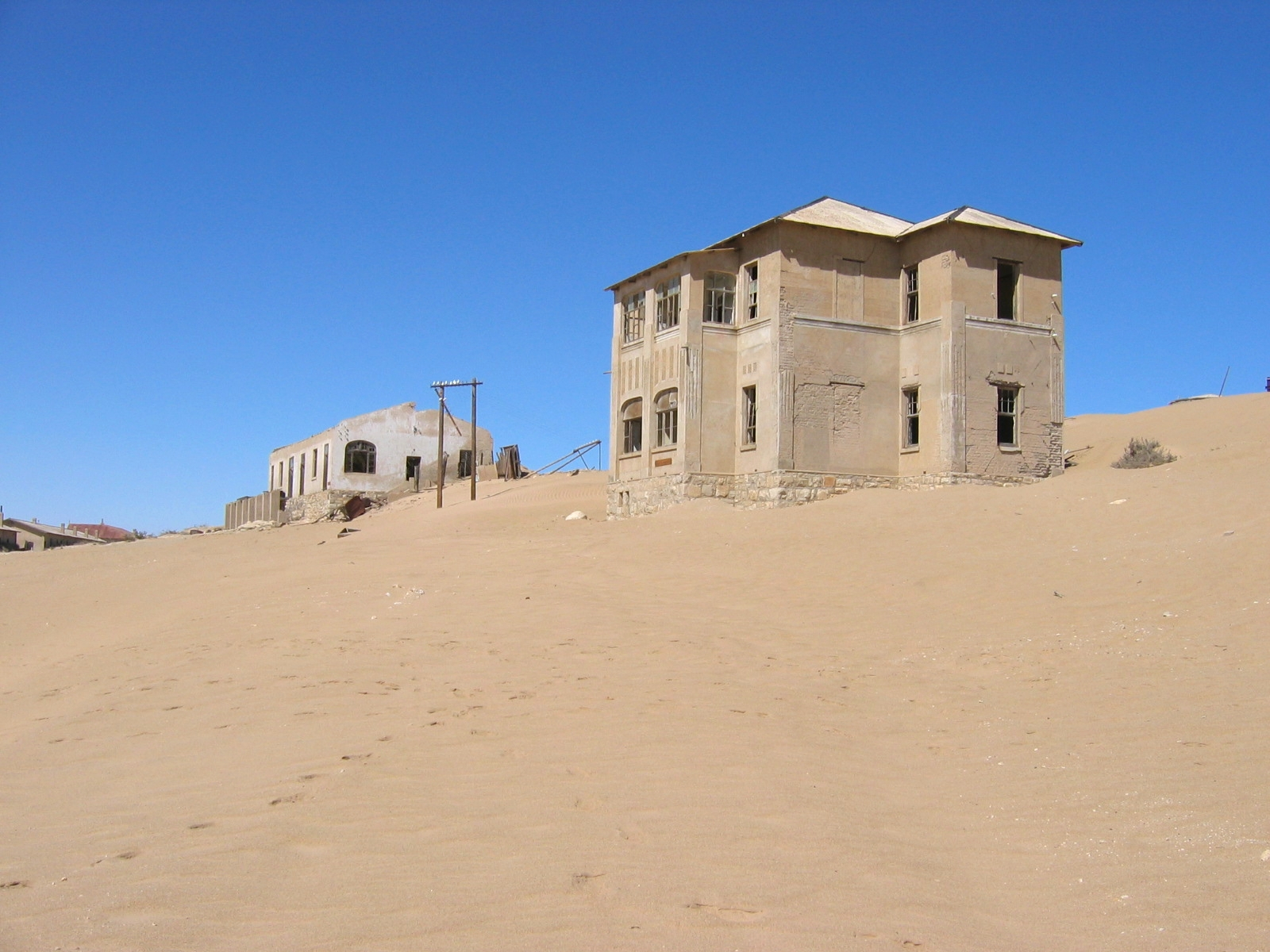
Abandoned houses in Kolmanskop

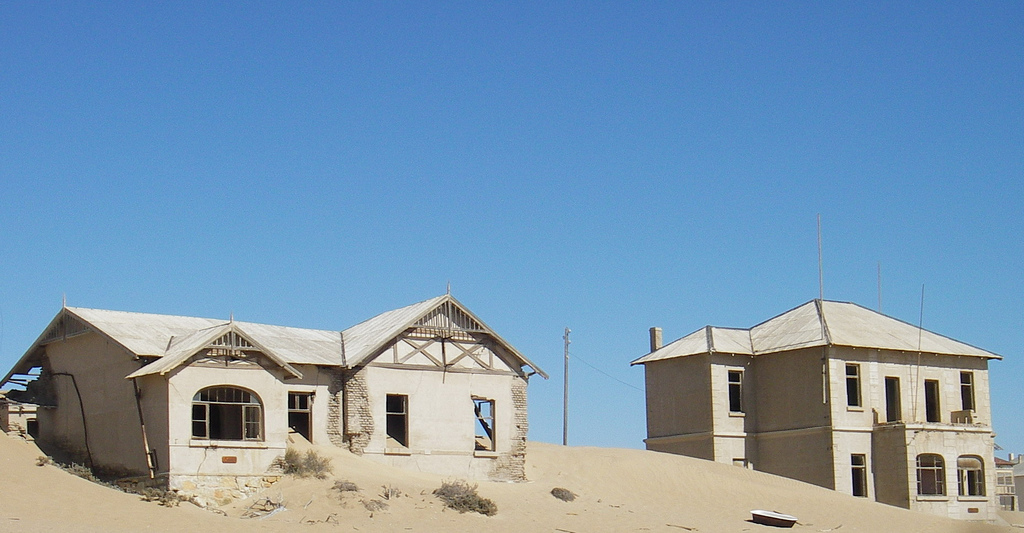
Abandoned houses

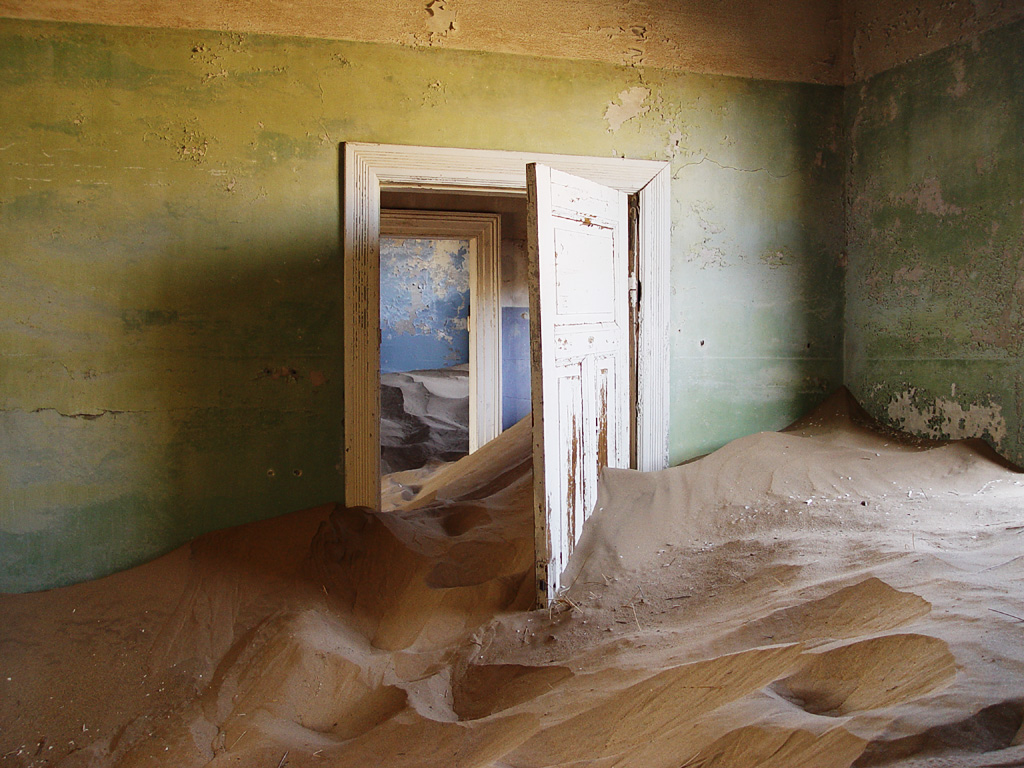
After the depopulation, sand invaded the houses

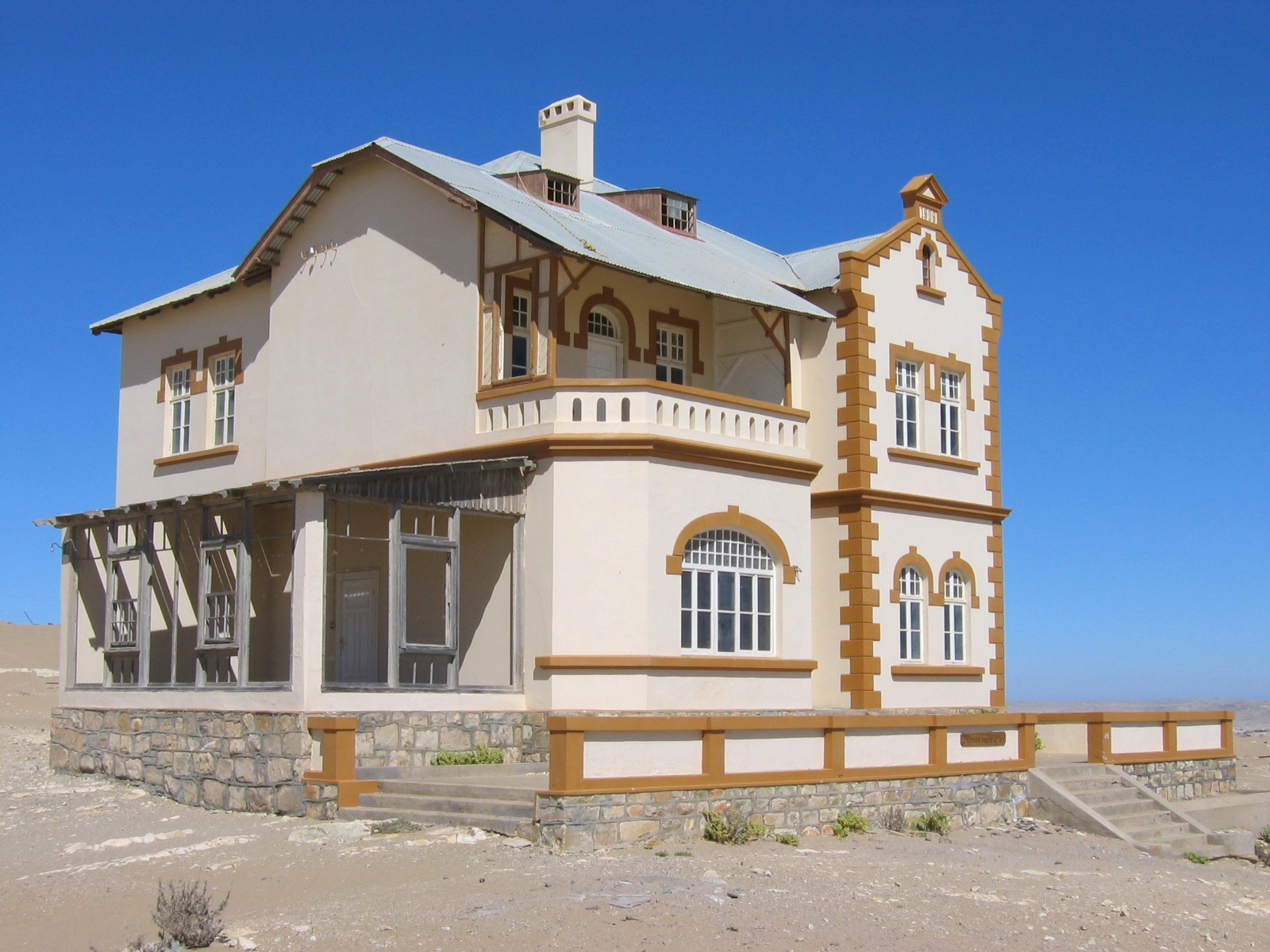
House of the former mine manager

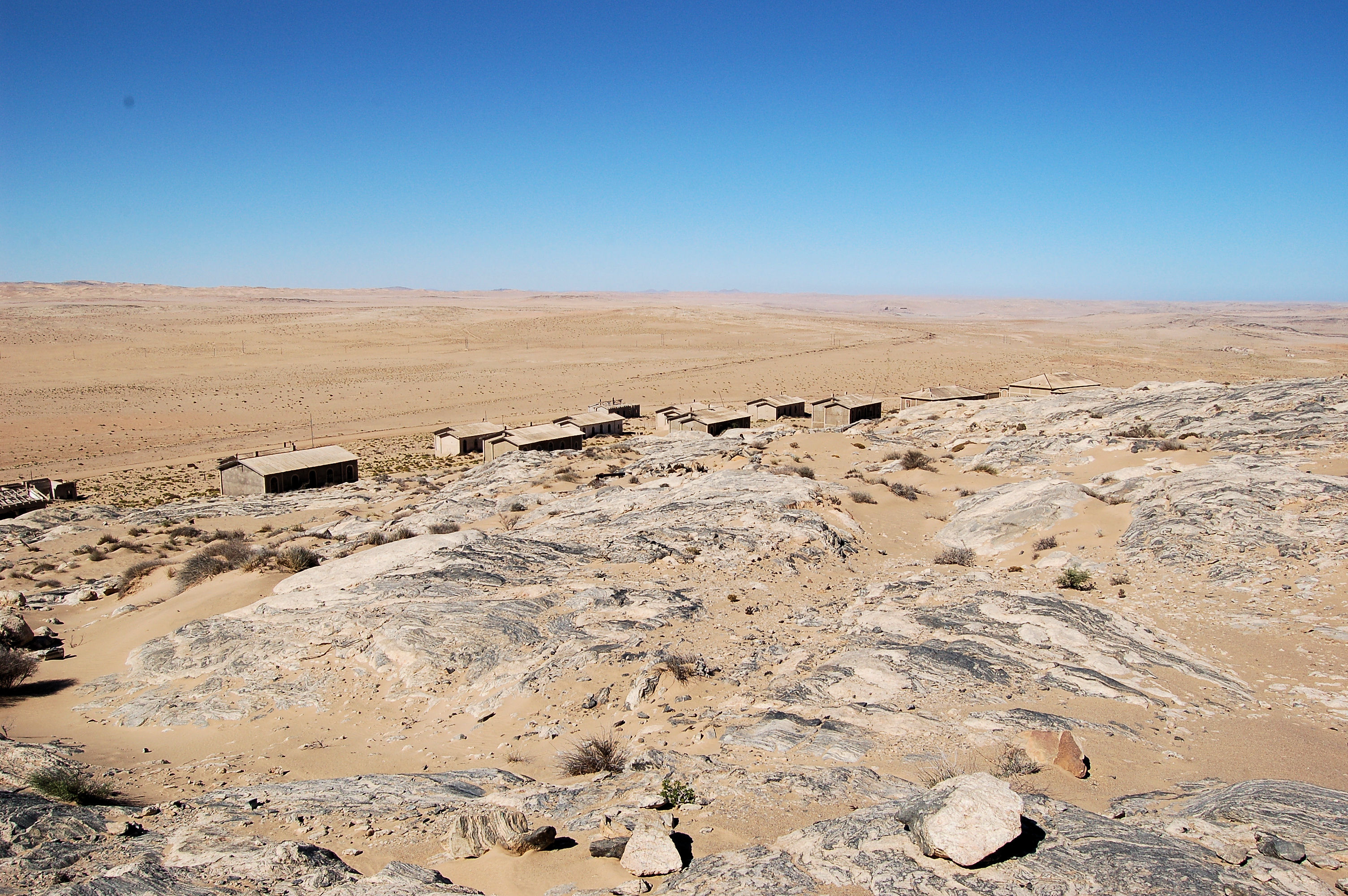
Main view of Kolmannskuppe

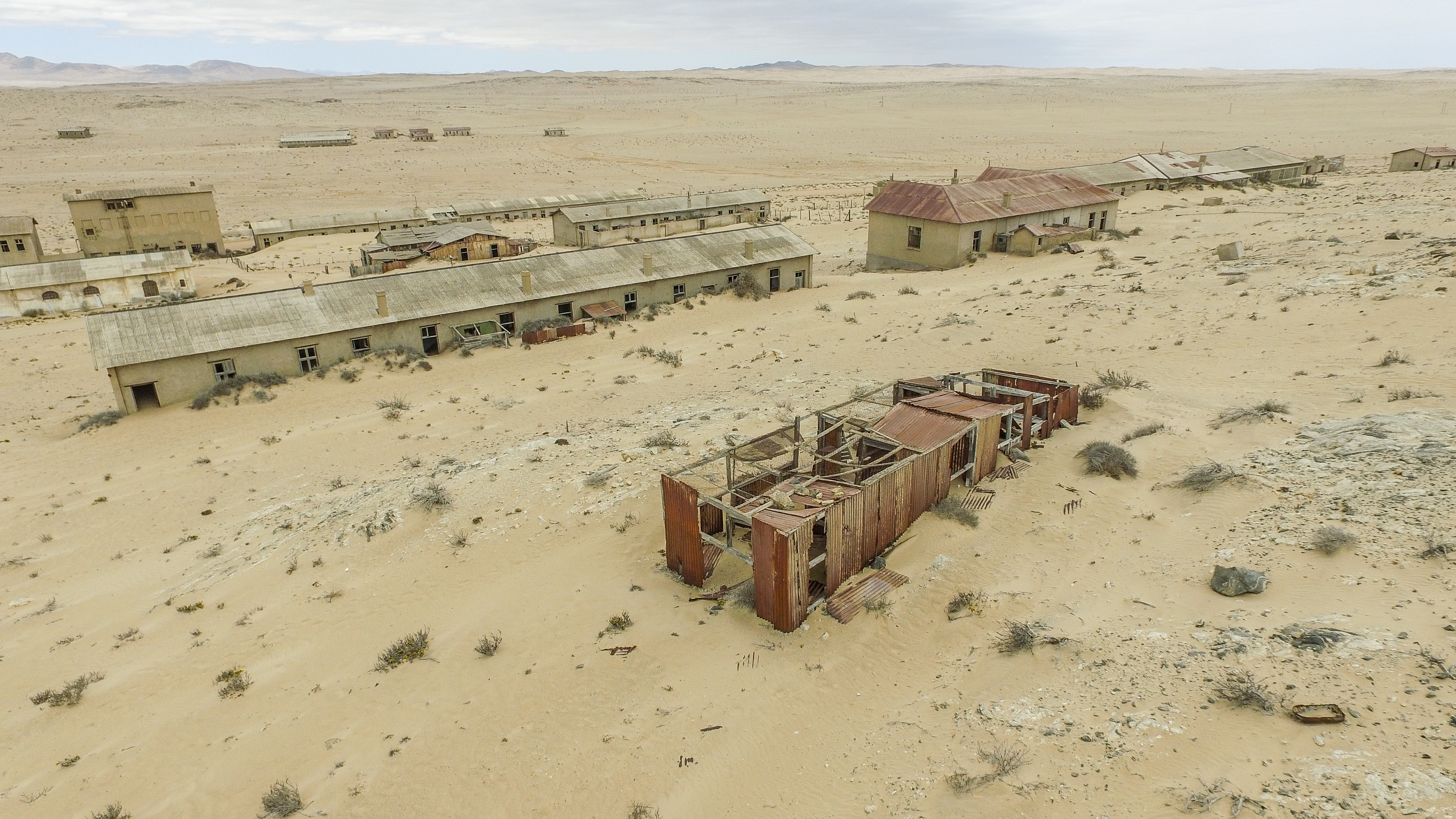
An aerial view of Kolmanskop

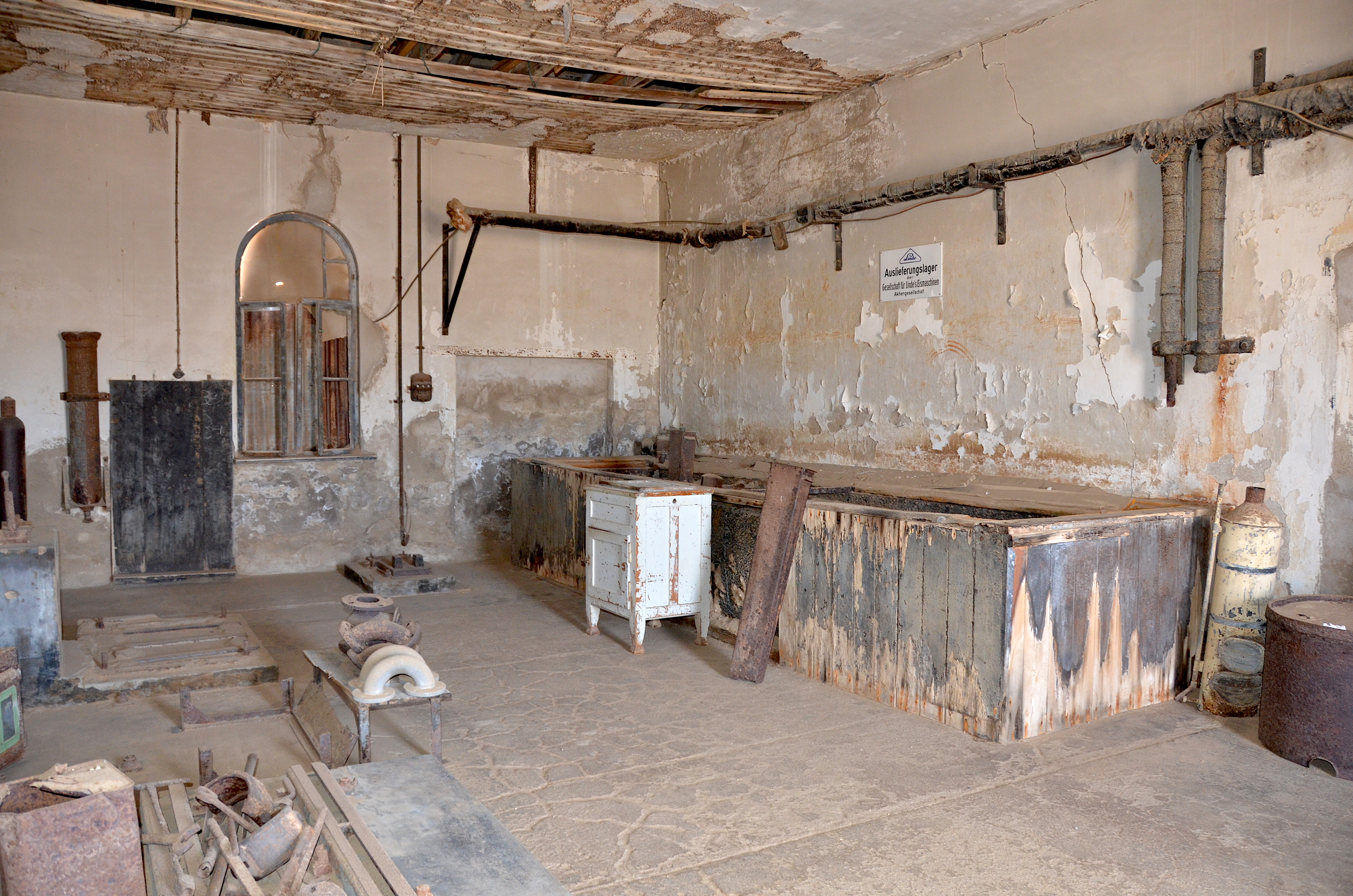
Ice factory

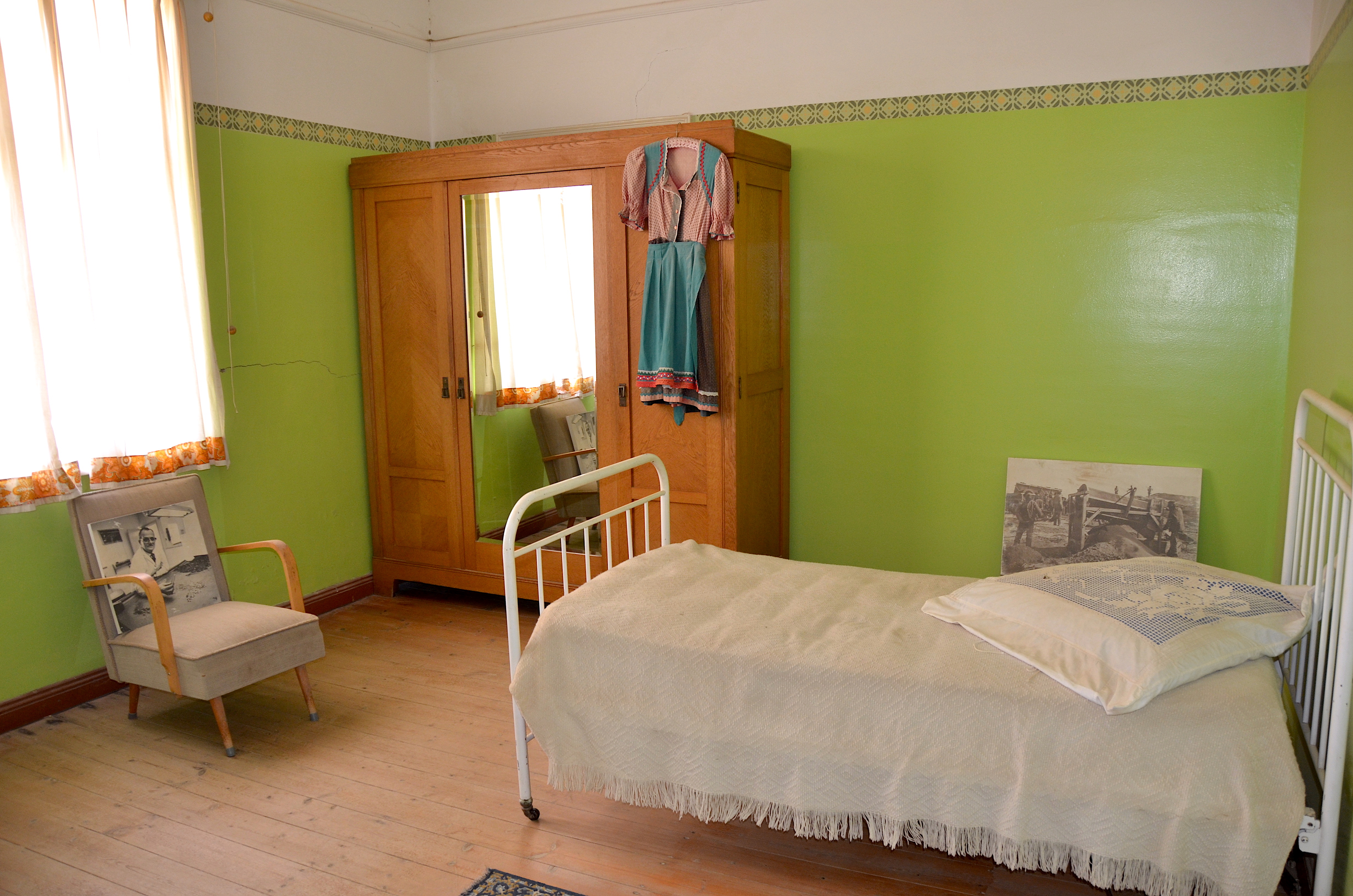
Bedroom

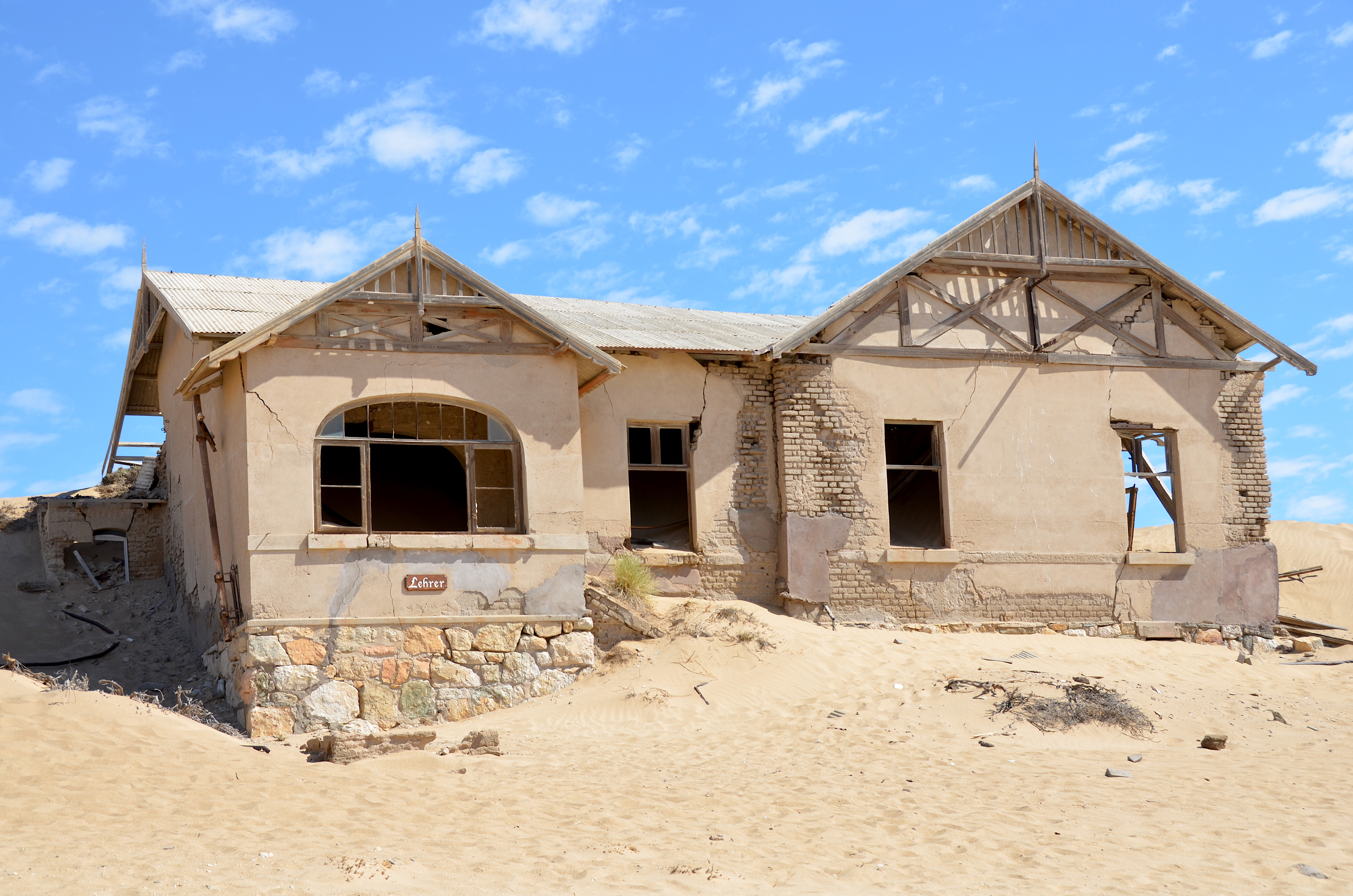
House of the teacher

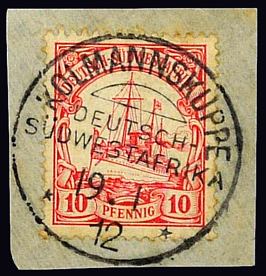
10 Pfennig stamp with postmark Kolmannskuppe 19. 1. 12

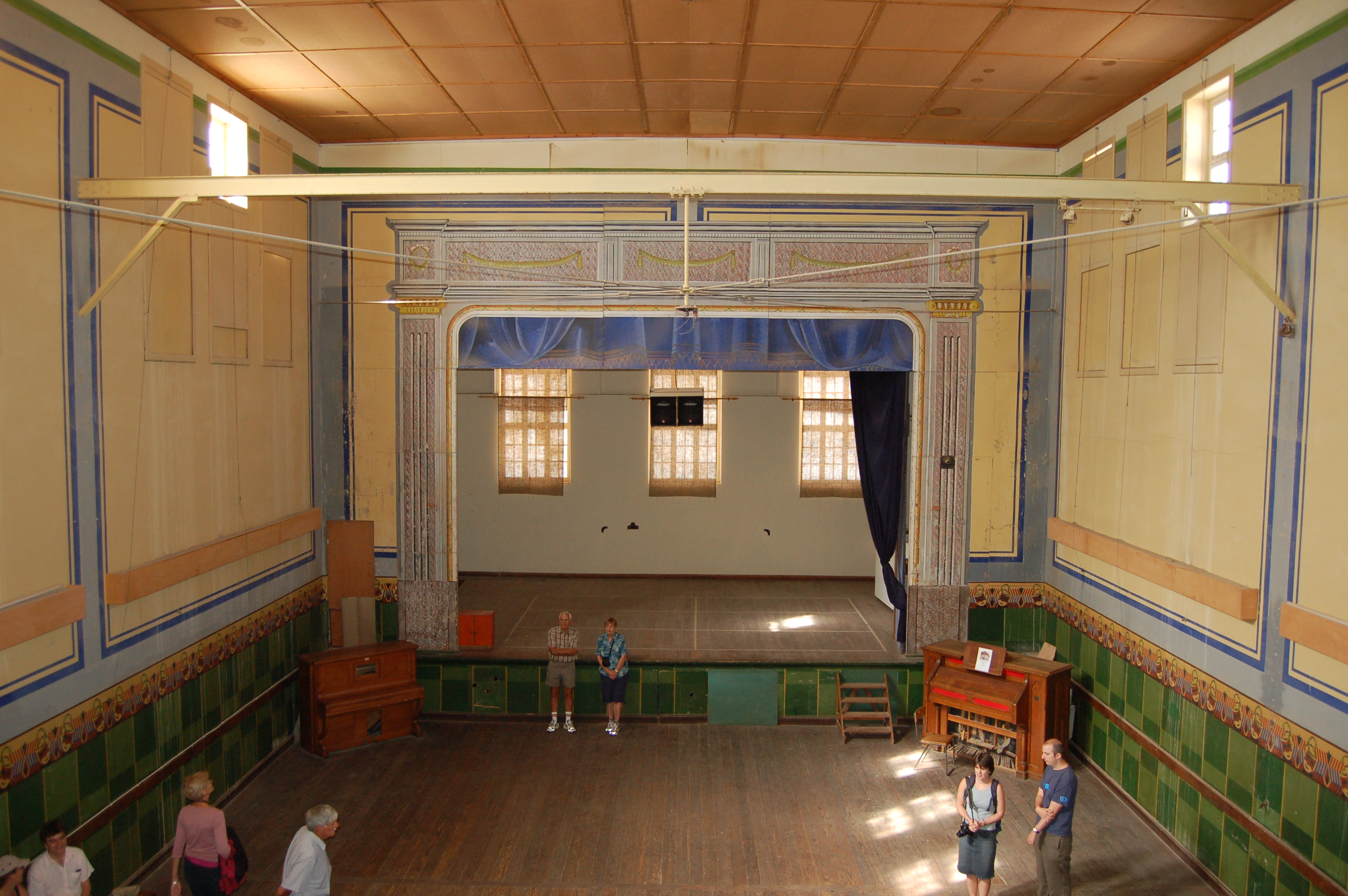
Inside Kolmanskop ballroom

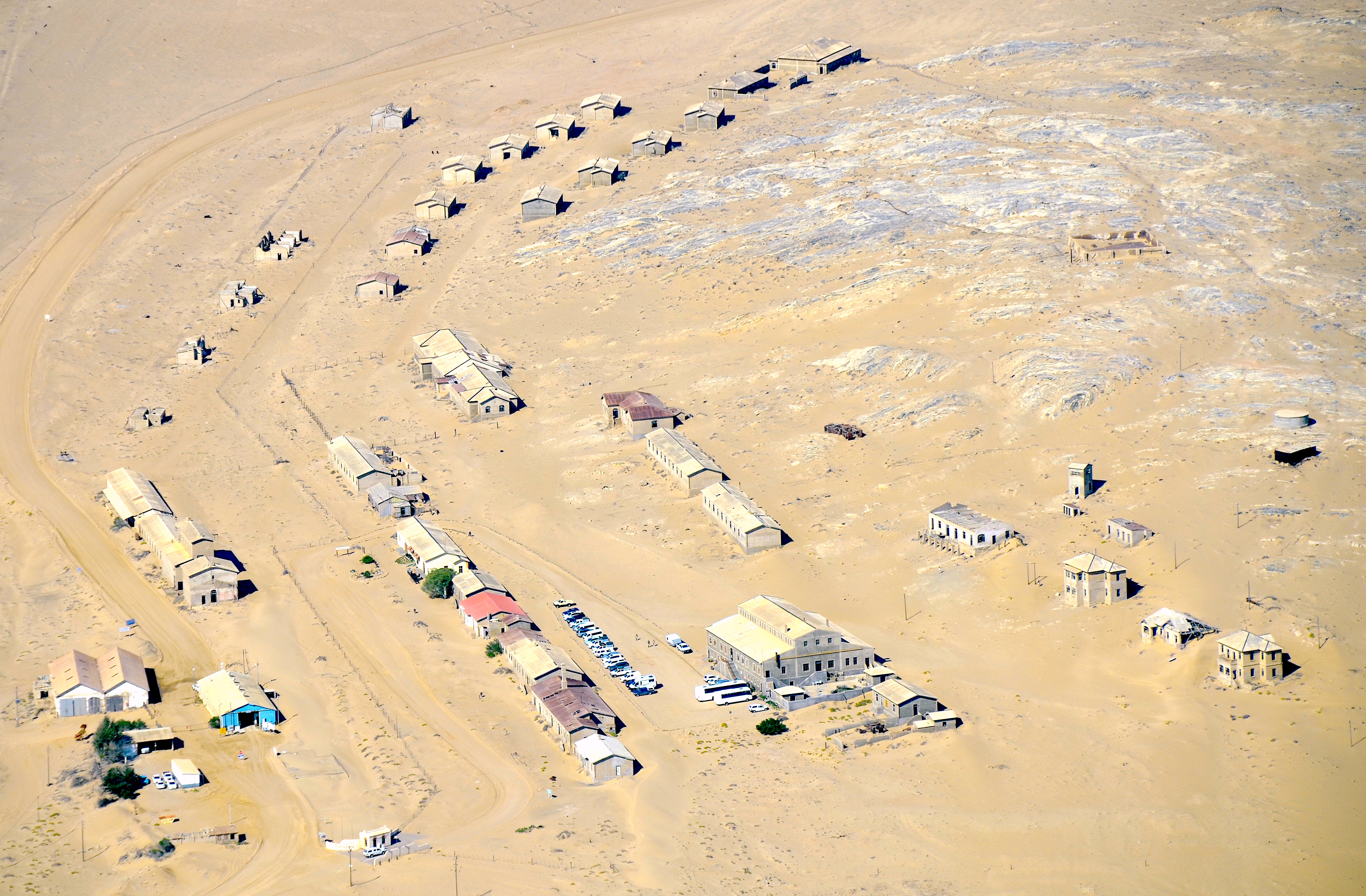
Aerial view of Kolmanskop (2017)

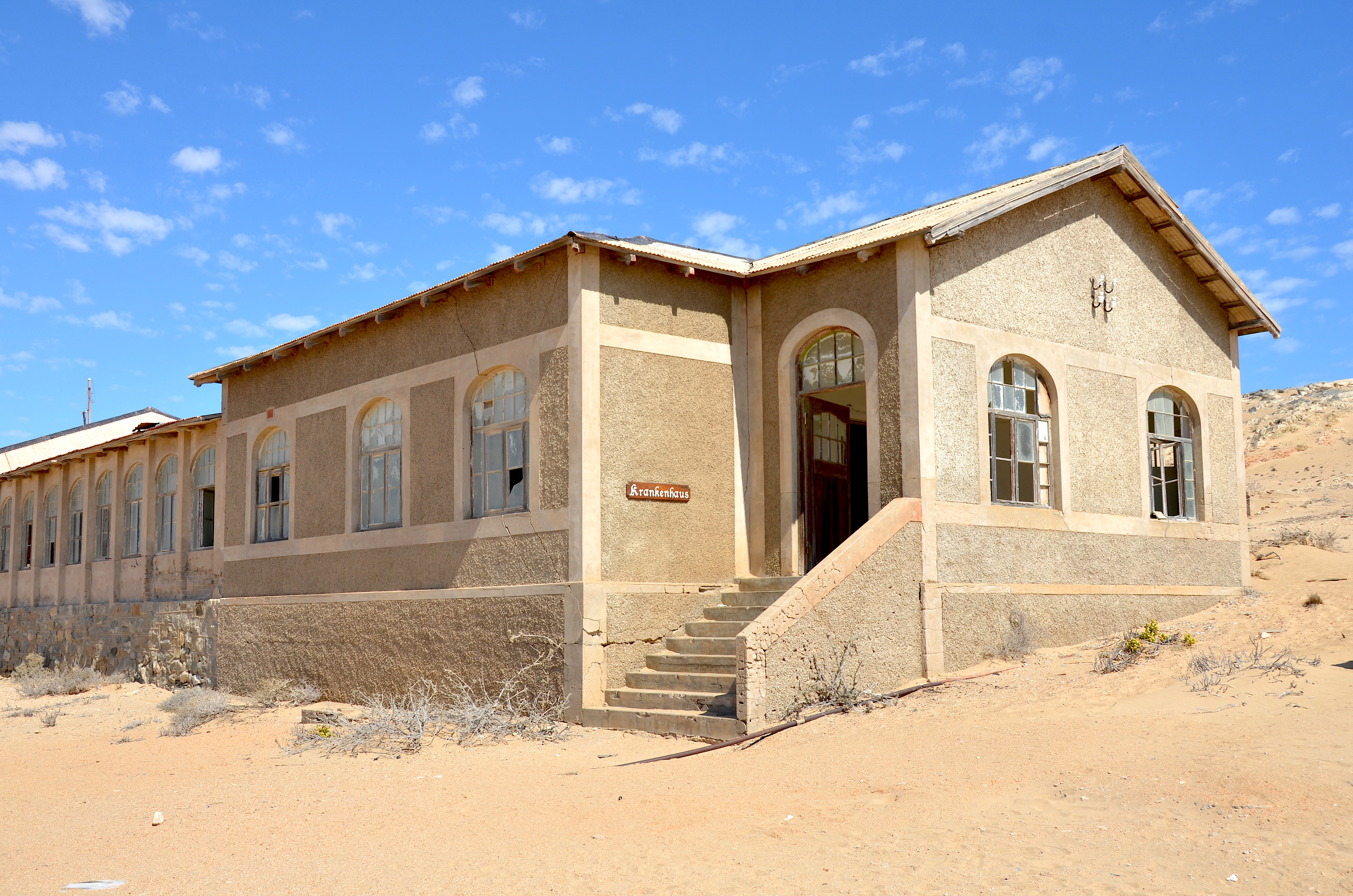
Hospital of Kolmanskop

== See also ==
- Elizabeth Bay
