= August Stauch =

This article has been translated from the German Wikipedia article.

August Stauch (15 January 1878 – 6 May 1947) was a German prospector who discovered a diamond deposits near Lüderitz, in German South West Africa (now Namibia).

August Stauch was the third of seven children of a railway worker's family in Ettenhausen, Thuringia. He was a railway employee in Thuringia. Stauch arrived in Lüderitz in 1907. He suffered from asthma and received medical advice that the drier desert climate may be suitable for his health. He took up mineralogy as a hobby in his spare time but later worked as a Bahnmeister (chief railway foreman) on the Lüderitzbucht-Aus railway line. He was entrusted with the task of keeping a 20 km long section of railway free from constant sand drifts.

August developed a fascination for diamonds, after listening to the tales about Adolf Lüderitz, who believed there lay diamonds in the desert and obtained a prospecting license from Deutsche Kolonialgesellschaft fur Südwest Afrika. He consequently informed his workers, who had been brought in from South Africa because of their experience in railroad workings, to look out for unusually shiny stones. On 10 April 1908 Zacharias Lewala, one of his aides who had previously worked at a diamond mine in Kimberley, picked up a diamond near Grasplatz and dutifully brought it to him.

Stauch quietly resigned from his job after confirming his suspicion that this may be a diamond, by scratching his glass watch with the stone. He found more pretty stones after a systematic search of the area and took them to his friend, mining engineer Sönke Nissen who lived in Lüderitz, where they were confirmed to be diamonds in June 1908.

These diamonds had flushed through the Orange River into the sea millions of years ago where the wind and waves washed it back in the sand of the Namib. The South West African diamonds are usually not very large, but clear like water and thus very popular on the market.

Stauch and Nissen initially kept the knowledge of the find to themselves, and only announced it after securing a 75-acre claim at Kolmanskop in order to continue to do diamond searching. Both were declared very wealthy men at the time.

A diamond rush set in, and the German government took immediate interest in the activities at Lüderitz, and dispatched the Secretary for the Colonies to investigate the situation and bring order and control to the industry. A diamond taxation system was introduced and the issuing of licenses was limited which brought about some order to the industry. The town of Lüderitz observed an economic boom between 1908 and 1914 and was temporarily known as Africa's richest town.

Stauch tried to increase his wealth further and invested in many companies – both in the colony and in Germany. However, in 1931, he lost most of his wealth through various misfortunes and the Great Depression.

He returned to Eisenach and died on 6 May 1947, aged 69, of stomach cancer.

== Bibliography ==
- Olga Levinson: Diamonds in the sand. The eventful life of August Stauch, 2007, ISBN 978-3-936858-02-0
- W. Bredow, H. Lotz, A. Stauch:The German diamonds and their recovery. A Reminder writing to the Provincial Exhibition Windhoek in 1914 published by the sponsors, Berlin 1914
- Bernd G. Längin: Die deutschen Kolonien: Schauplätze und Schicksale 1888 – 1918. [German Colonies: Places and Fates 1888 – 1918] (In German). Mittler & Sohn, Hamburg 2005.
