= Zacharias Lewala =

Miner in German South West Africa, set off diamond rush

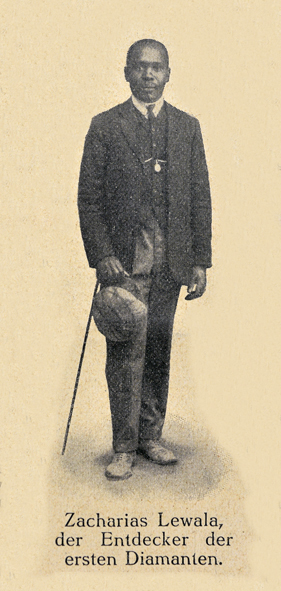
Lewala in 1908

Zacharias Lewala (fl. 1908) was a Namibian worker, considered to have started a diamond rush in the area of Lüderitz in the former colony of German South West Africa, now Namibia, with his discovery of a diamond on 14 April 1908.

== Life ==
Lewala came from southern Africa and was a worker in a diamond mine in Kimberley, where he gained experience in the recognition of rough diamonds. Later he worked under his superior August Stauch at the maintenance of the Aus–Lüderitz railway line. In 1908, when he was scouting near the railway station at Grasplatz, he discovered several stones which he suspected to be diamonds. He dutifully handed these over to Stauch and said: "Look, Mister, moy Klip (beautiful stone)." Stauch sent it for analysis to Swakopmund and secured a claim in the area. Realising the area was full of diamonds, the German government prohibited entry to almost the entire extent of Namibia's southern coast soon thereafter, declaring it the "Sperrgebiet", meaning "forbidden zone".

About Lewala, comparatively little is known, as historiography, and especially tourist literature, are more interested in the German Stauch, whose activity is better documented, and with which European tourists can more easily identify. Zora del Buono remarks in an article in the German news magazine der Spiegel:

"Lewala's name entered history but not much more, the man had nothing of his find, no one paid him for it or showed any kind of gratitude, others made the big business and they made it quick."
