= Bogenfels =

Location in the Namib Desert of Namibia

Coordinates: 27°27′38″S 15°23′31″E

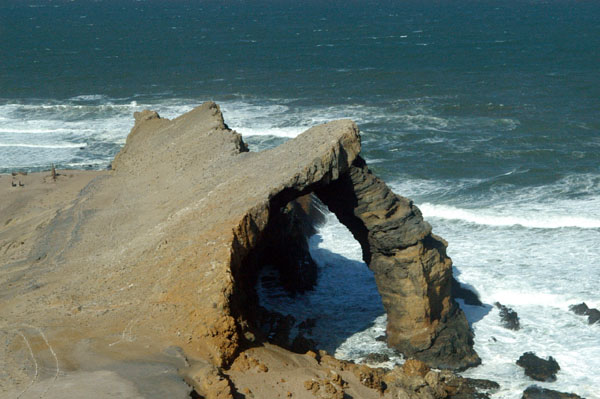
Close up aerial photograph of Bogenfels

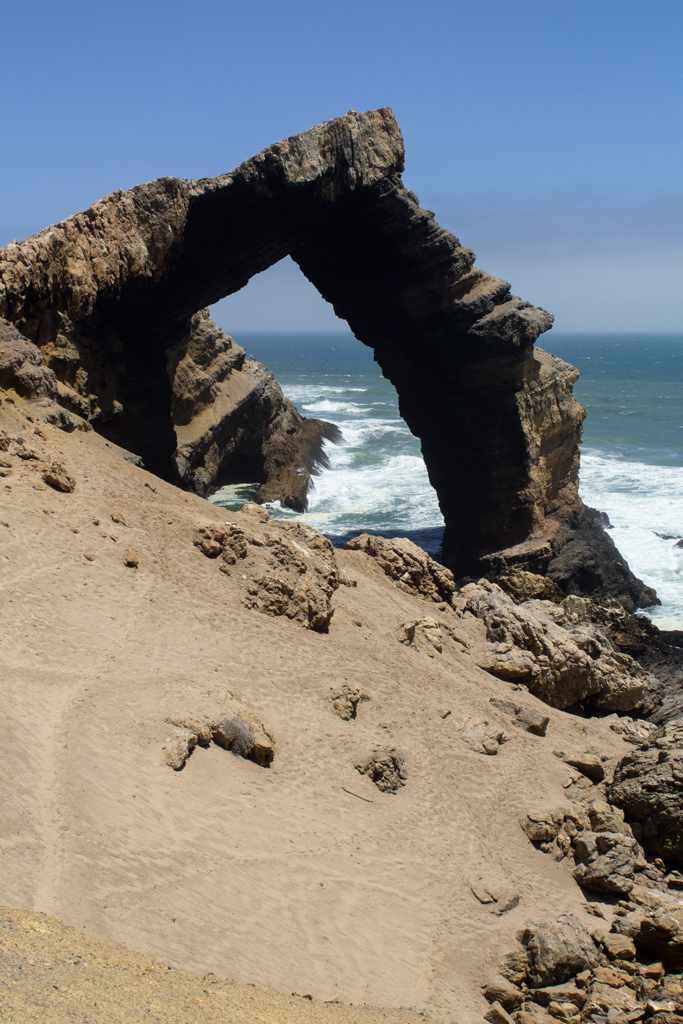
Approaching Bogenfels on foot

Bogenfels is a location in the coastal Namib Desert of Namibia, noted for its natural rock formations (hence the name, which means "arch rock" in German). The main formation is a 55-metre (180 ft) high rock arch close to the coast. It is not easily accessible, due to the terrain and its location within a restricted diamond-mining area Sperrgebiet, at 27° 28'S, about 95 kilometres (59 mi) south of Lüderitz and 32 kilometres (20 mi) south of Pomona but there are official guided tours.

== Geology ==
With its highest point at 55 metres (180 ft) above sea level, the formation is a mix of hard dolomite and soft shale.

== Settlement ==
A settlement developed in the area after diamonds were discovered. In 1950, it was evacuated and has remained a ghost town since. A private narrow-gauge electrified railway once served the diamond mining industry. It ran 119 kilometres (74 mi) via Pomona to Kolmanskop and was powered by a 1.5 megawatts (2,000 hp) power station in Lüderitz. It was completed in 1913 but destroyed in World War I in 1915 by South African troops.
