= Elizabeth Bay, Namibia =

Elizabeth Bay
- Ghost town
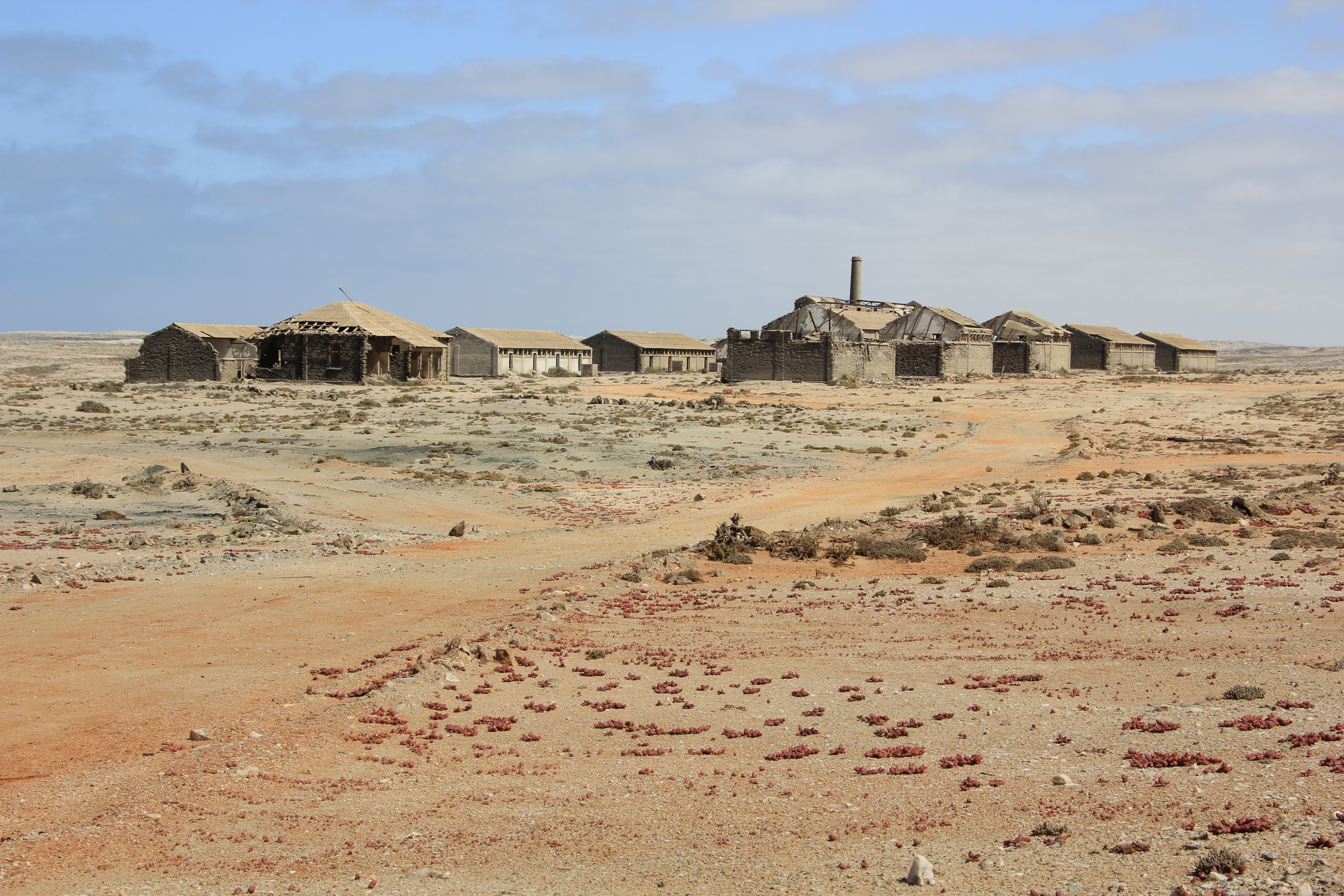

- Location in Namibia
- Coordinates: 26°54′58″S 15°11′02″E
- Country: Namibia
- Region: ǁKaras Region
- Constituency: Lüderitz Constituency

Population
  - Total: 0
- Time zone: UTC+1 (South African Standard Time)

Elizabeth Bay is a mining town on the southern coast of Namibia, 25 km (16 mi) south of Lüderitz. It was formerly considered a ghost town. Diamonds were first discovered in the region around 1908. However, it wasn't until 1989 that the government of Namibia spent $53 million on the exploration and creation of a new diamond mine on the site. The mine had a projected life-span of ten years and was expected to produce 2.5 million carats of diamonds. The mine was officially opened by Sam Nujoma on 2 August 1991 and stopped being operational around 1998. By 2000, the town was considered a ghost town. Because of being located in a restricted area, a permit is required for a visit.

In 2005 it was announced that the mine would be expanded, thus furthering its lifespan by eight years. The mine was operated by Namdeb, owned jointly by De Beers and the Namibia Government. As of 2009 the Elizabeth Bay mine was operating at a $76 million loss. The mine was sold to Sperrgebiet Diamond Mining in 2020.

Elizabeth Bay is home to forty percent of the world's Cape fur seals.

== Media ==
- The derelict theater building in Elizabeth Bay was filmed in a 2010 episode of Life After People: The Series which was mainly featuring Kolmanskop, another ghost town approximately 30 km (20 mi) north of Elizabeth Bay. The episode focused on the effects of wind and sand upon the various run-down buildings and displayed rooms that were filled with sand.
- Elizabeth Bay was a filming location for the 2024 post-apocalyptic television series Fallout as the location of the main protagonist's vault, supposedly located beneath Santa Monica Pier. The houses of Kolmanskop and the wreckage of the Eduard Bohlen were also featured.

== Climate ==
Climate data for Elizabeth Bay
Month	Jan	Feb	Mar	Apr	May	Jun	Jul	Aug	Sep	Oct	Nov	Dec	Year
Mean daily maximum °C (°F)	21 (69)	21 (69)	20 (68)	19 (66)	19 (66)	18 (64)	18 (64)	17 (62)	17 (62)	18 (64)	19 (66)	20 (68)	18 (64)
Mean daily minimum °C (°F)	14 (57)	14 (57)	13 (55)	12 (53)	11 (51)	11 (51)	10 (50)	10 (50)	10 (50)	11 (51)	12 (53)	13 (55)	11 (51)
Average precipitation cm (inches)	0 (0)	0.25 (0.1)	0.25 (0.1)	0.25 (0.1)	0.25 (0.1)	0.25 (0.1)	0.25 (0.1)	0.25 (0.1)	0 (0)	0 (0)	0 (0)	0 (0)	1.5 (0.6)
Source: Weatherbase

== See also ==
- Kolmanskop
- Pomona
