= Grasplatz =

Railway station in Namibia

Coordinates: 26°44′S 15°17′E

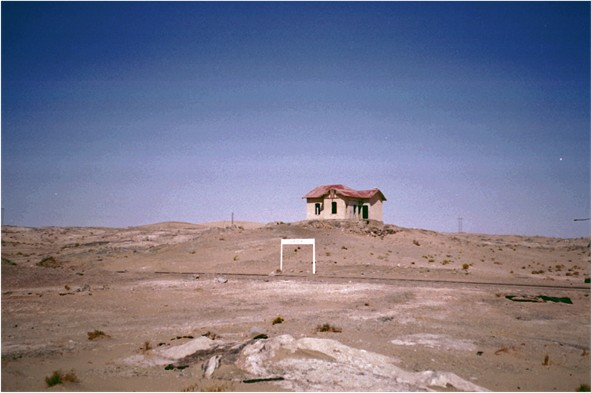
Grasplatz Station

Grasplatz (grass place) is a defunct railway station in the south of Namibia on the currently decommissioned Aus–Lüderitz line. It is the place where in 1908 railway worker Zacharias Lewala found the first diamond in German South-West Africa and handed it over to his foreman August Stauch. Stauch's subsequent investigation triggered a diamond rush.

The place was originally called Grasabladeplatz (grass offload point) because here, before the railway was in place, alfalfa was stored to feed oxen before the ox wagons set off through the waterless Namib.
