= Diamond rush =

New diamond discovery triggering an onrush of miners seeking their fortune

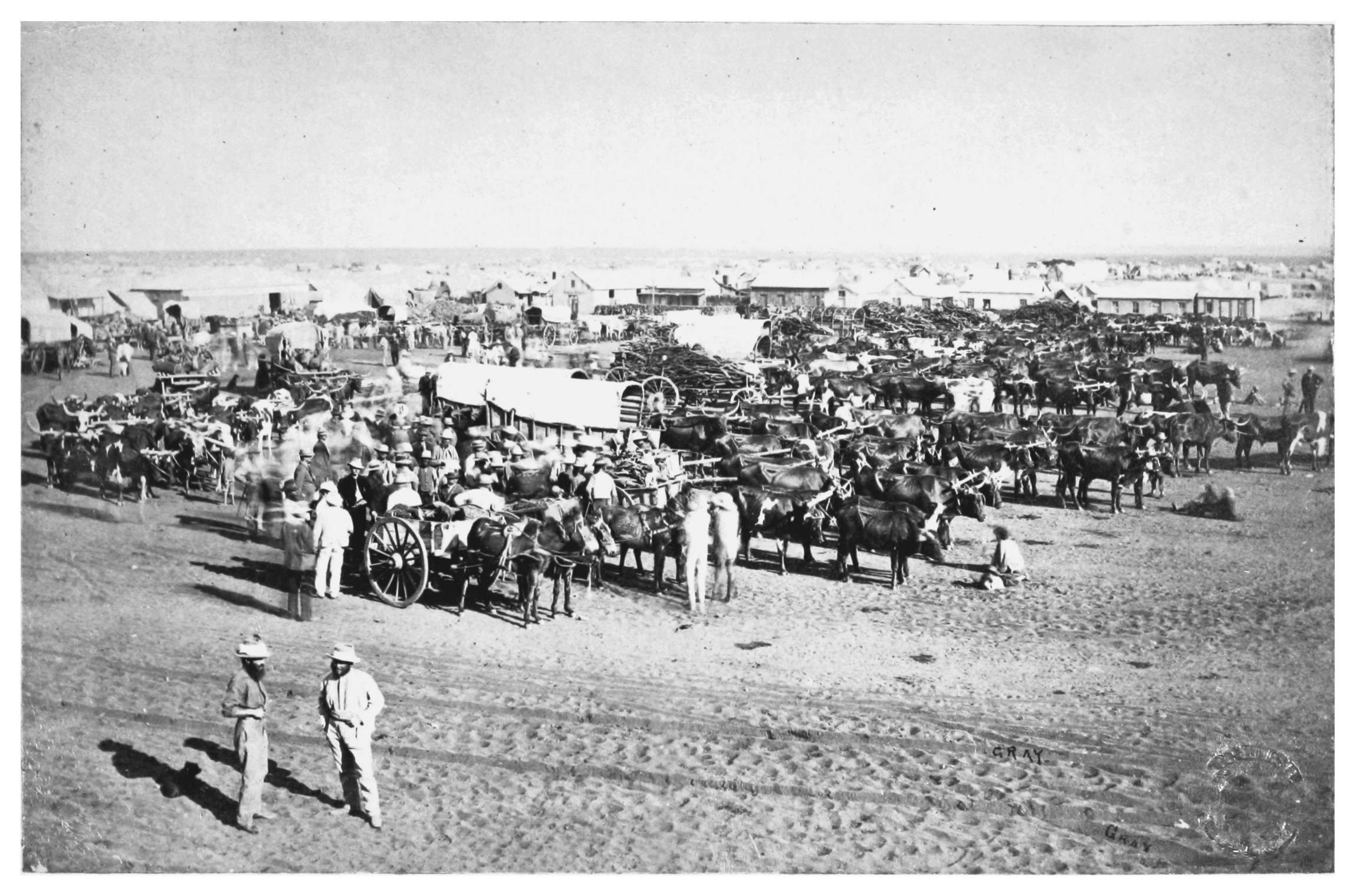
The New Rush market, Kimberley, South Africa, 1873

A diamond rush is a period of feverish migration of workers to an area where diamonds were newly discovered. Major diamond rushes took place in the late 19th and early 20th centuries in South Africa and South-West Africa.

== Diamond rushes by chronology ==
- In 1871, the discovery of an 83.50 carat (16.7 g) diamond on the slopes of Colesberg Kopje on the farm Vooruitzigt in South Africa led to the foundation of Kimberley Mine, and eventually the town of Kimberley. This diamond rush was termed the "New Rush", as diamond prospectors were already operating in the country.
- In 1908, the discovery of a diamond near Grasplatz station in German South-West Africa caused a diamond rush, which led to the development of the town of Lüderitz and several mining settlements to come into existence - to be abandoned eventually to become ghost towns.
- In the 1990s, several frequency domain heliborne electromagnetic anomalies were discovered by Charles E. Fipke around Lac de Gras, a lake in the Northwest Territories of Canada. Several mines were established, leading to the Canada diamond rush.

== See also ==
- Gold rush
