= ǃNamiǂNûs Constituency =

Electoral constituency in the ǁKaras region of southern Namibia

Coordinates: 26°38′S 15°9′E

ǃNamiǂNûs constituency (red) in the ǁKaras Region

ǃNamiǂNûs ([ᵑǃa.mi.ᵑǂũ̀ṹs]; until 2013 Lüderitz) is an electoral constituency in the ǁKaras Region of Namibia. It covers an area of 48,271 km^{2} (18,638 sq mi) and contains the major town of Lüderitz, after which the constituency was originally named. In 2011, it had a population of 13,859, down from 14,542 in 2001. As of 2020 the constituency had 9,670 registered voters.

== Politics ==
ǃNamiǂNûs Constituency is traditionally a stronghold of the South West Africa People's Organization (SWAPO) party. In the 2004 regional elections, its candidate David Shoombe was elected with 4,135 of the 4,468 votes cast. In the 2010 regional elections, Jan Albertus Scholtz (SWAPO) won the constituency with 3,526 votes. His only challenger was Phyllicia Maree’ Hercules of the Rally for Democracy and Progress (RDP), who received 559 votes. In the 2015 regional elections Swapo won the constituency without any contesting opposition candidate.

The 2020 regional election saw six candidates competing for the councillor position and was only narrowly won by SWAPO. Its candidate Hambelela Ndjaleka obtained 1,654 votes, ahead of Tshinana Petrus Tshiqwetha of the Independent Patriots for Change (IPC), an opposition party formed in August 2020, who obtained 1,438 votes. Fritz Dausab of the Landless People's Movement (LPM, a new party registered in 2018) came third with 567 votes, independent candidates Reginald Paul Hercules and Michaeleno Kadhikwa got 322 and 121 votes respectively, and Gideon Kondjeni Kalenga of the Popular Democratic Movement (PDM) obtained 228.

== Renaming controversy ==
Lüderitz Constituency was renamed in August 2013, originally to ǃNamiǂNüs. Namibia's president Hifikepunye Pohamba stated that:

"I have accepted the [4th Delimitation] Commission's recommendation that Lüderitz Constituency be renamed ǃNamiǂNûs Constituency which was the original name of the area. This includes the current town of Lüderitz".

Other spellings of the name also popped up, and arguments arose whether or not the president's statement implied a name change of the town Lüderitz, and if so, what the town's demonym would then be. The current interpretation of the statement is that only the constituency has been renamed.

The meaning of the name !Namiǂnûs is not universally accepted. It is a term of the Khoekhoe language of the ǃAman, a subtribe of the Nama people, the inhabitants of the area before German colonialisation. Erwin Leuschner stated that even Khoekhoe natives are divided on its spelling but that it "certainly" means embrace. Christopher Torchia reports that the meaning is more specific, place embraced by the water.
