= Gys Hofmeyr =

Administrator of South West Africa (now Namibia)

The Right Honourable Gysbert Reitz Hofmeyr CMG
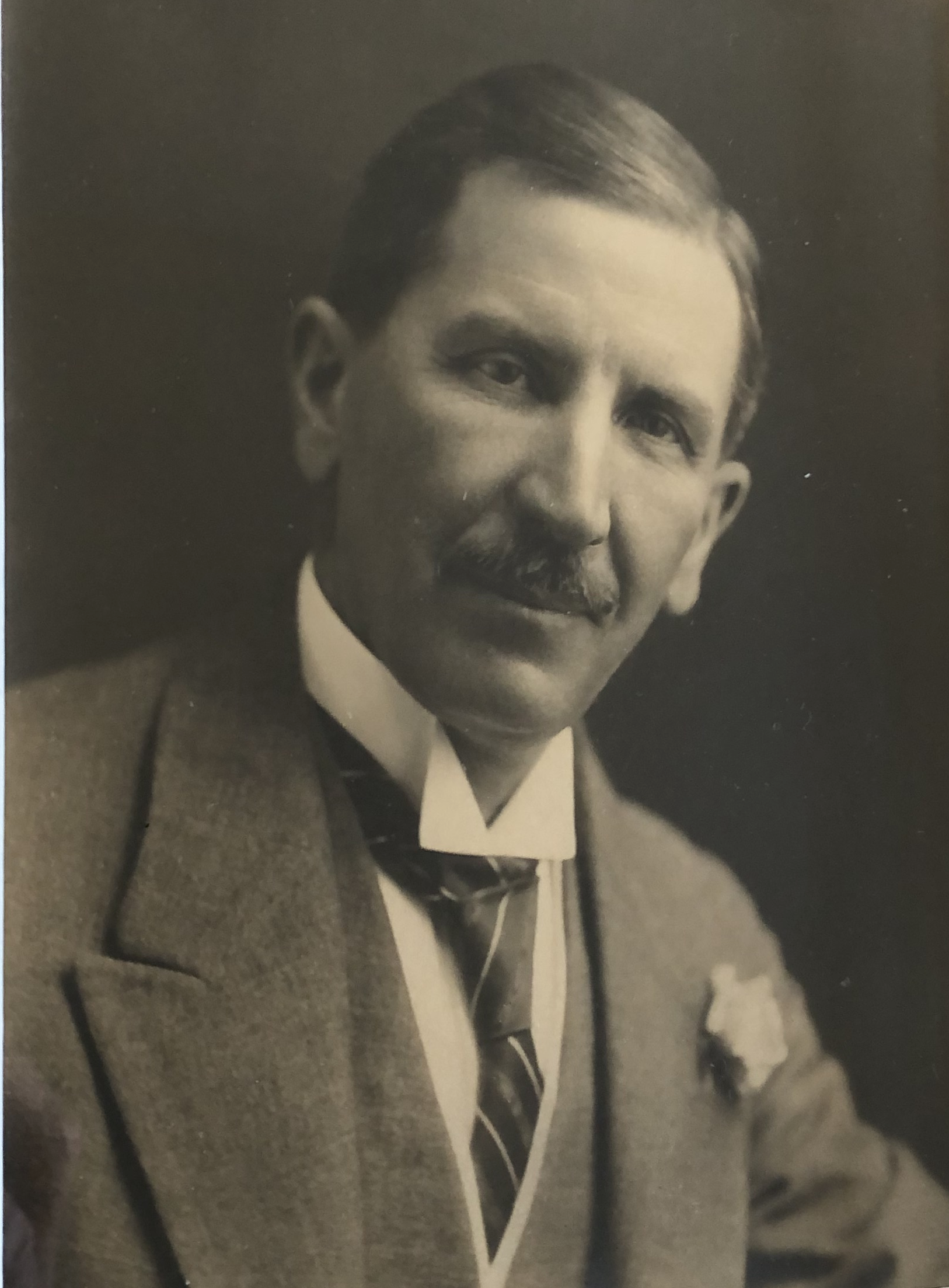
- Hofmeyr c. 1910

1st Mandatory Administrator of South West Africa
- In office 1 October 1920 – 1 April 1926
- Monarch: George V
- Governors-General: Sydney Buxton, 1st Earl Buxton; Prince Arthur of Connaught; Alexander Cambridge, 1st Earl of Athlone
- Preceded by: Sir Edmond Howard Lacam Gorges
- Succeeded by: Albertus Johannes Werth

Personal details
- Born: Gysbert Reitz Hofmeyr; 12 February 1871 Riversdale, Cape Colony
- Died: 12 March 1942 (aged 71) Lakeside, Cape, Union of South Africa
- Spouse: Ydie Louis Dankwertz Nel
- Children: 4
- Education: Victoria College, Stellenbosch

Gysbert Reitz Hofmeyr (12 February 1871 – 12 March 1942) was a South African civil servant and the first Administrator of South West Africa (now Namibia) under the League of Nations Mandate. As secretary for the Transvaal delegation to the National Convention in 1908–1909, Hofmeyr was a witness to the unification of the Cape, Natal, Transvaal and Orange River colonies. The new Union of South Africa became a self-governing dominion of the British Empire in 1910. Hofmeyr continued close to power as clerk of the new Union government's House of Assembly from 1910 to 1920. He published numerous political writings calling for greater unity between the English and Dutch inhabitants of South Africa.

In 1920 Hofmeyr was appointed as the first Administrator of South West Africa under the League of Nations Mandate by Jan Smuts (then Prime Minister of South Africa). As Administrator Hofmeyr strongly encouraged white settlers from the Union and introduced numerous measures designed to ensure that the local Black and Coloured inhabitants would work for the white settlers. Historian John Wellington's view is that in doing so Hofmeyr failed to “promote to the utmost the material and moral well-being and social progress of the inhabitants of the territory” as required under the League of Nations Mandate.

Hofmeyr's actions during the Bondelswarts Rebellion in 1922, described by Ruth First as "the Sharpeville of the 1920s", were controversial, especially the use of warplanes, aerial bombs and strafing against lightly armed Blacks. He was criticized by the Permanent Mandates Commission report into the Bondelswarts affair. Although the report held that Hofmeyr had "acted wisely in taking prompt steps to uphold government authority", it found that the repression of the uprising was "carried out with excessive severity".

Hofmeyr stood for election to the Parliament of South Africa for the Riversdale constituency in 1929 but lost to a nationalist opponent who taunted him about his Bondelswarts misjudgements. Hofmeyr sued the opponent for libel and ultimately won the case, but the loss at the election effectively ended Hofmeyr's political career.

== Early years ==
Hofmeyr was the third son and fifth child born to Jan Hendrik Hofmeyr (born in Cape Town in 1835, died in Riversdale in 1923) and Christina Jacoba van Zyl (born in 1838, died in Riversdale in 1921), Afrikaners who farmed in Riversdale in the British Cape Colony.

Hofmeyr worked on the family farm while growing up and only had three or four years of formal education. In 1895 Hofmeyr married Ydie Louise Dankwertz Nel (born in Somerset East in 1872, died in Cape Town in 1943) in Oudtshoorn. Ydie was the daughter of PAPJ Nel of Bruintes Hoogte, Somerset East.

== Early career ==
=== Civil service and education ===
In 1890, at the age of nineteen, Hofmeyr entered the Cape Civil Service. His first appointment was in the Lands and Deeds Office at King William's Town. Later that year Hofmeyr became Magistrate's Clerk at Oudtshoorn, and he was subsequently attached to the Circuit Court and to various magistracies in the Cape Colony. Entering the Attorney-General's office, and after passing the relevant internal examinations, Hofmeyr acted as Civil Commissioner and Resident Magistrate at Oudtshoorn in 1894, and later in Malmesbury and then Stellenbosch.

In Stellenbosch he studied after hours at Victoria College. Victoria College (originally Stellenbosch College, now Stellenbosch University) had been renamed in 1887 when it acquired university status. Although later in the 20th century Stellenbosch University became a centre of strident Afrikaner nationalism, in the years that Hofmeyr was there Victoria College was a liberal institution staffed largely by Lowland Scottish "brither Presbyterians".

In 1895 the Crown colony of British Bechuanaland, the southern part of the Bechuanaland Protectorate), was incorporated into the Cape Colony. The northern part remained a British Protectorate until its independence as Botswana in 1966). Hofmeyr was selected to move to Vryburg and Mafeking to assist in assimilating the system of administration there with that in the Cape Colony. This early experience of assisting the incorporation of British Bechuanaland into the Cape influenced his later thinking that a natural progression for South West Africa would be integration into South Africa.

=== Early political influences ===
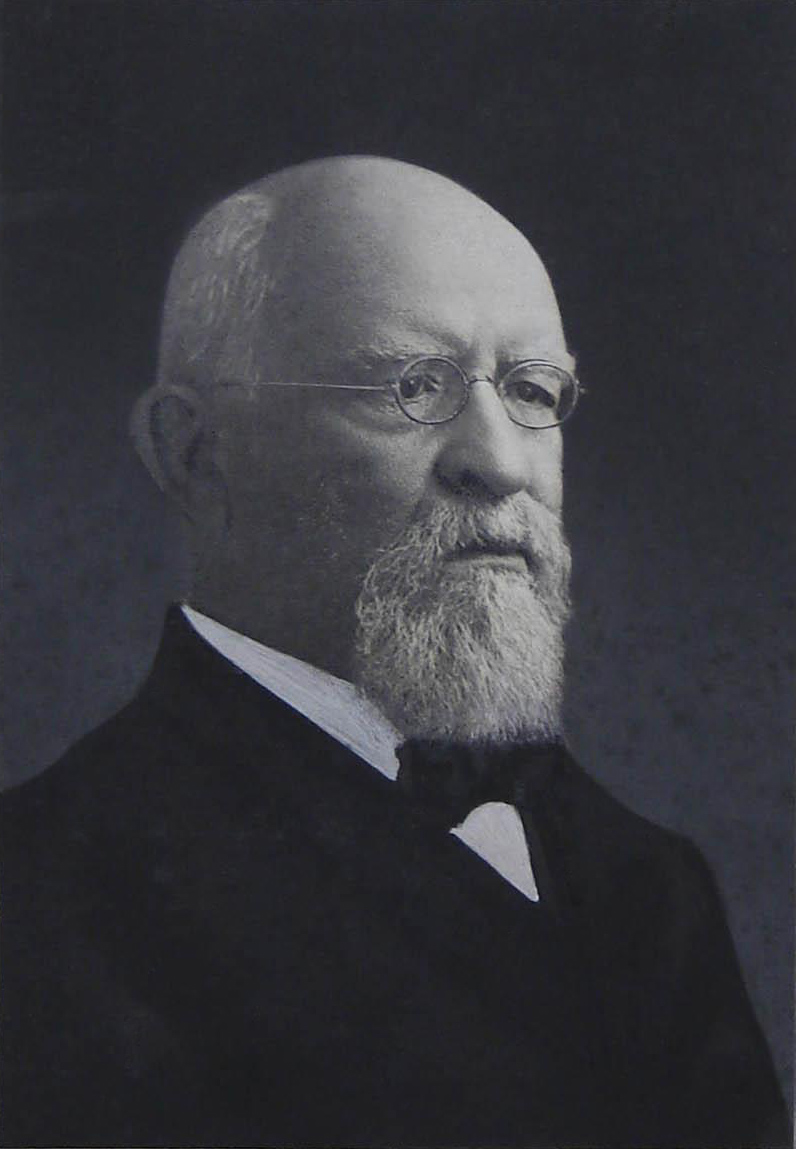
Onze Jan Hofmeyr

Hofmeyr's father was a cousin of Jan Henrik Hofmeyr, known as "Onze Jan" — a prominent politician and member of the Cape parliament for Stellenbosch from 1879 to 1909. The political activities of both Onze Jan Hofmeyr and Jan Smuts made a deep impression on Gysbert Reitz Hofmeyr, and the younger Hofmeyr decided to move closer to the corridors of power. Writing to Mr A Brink of Kimberley on 3 April 1919, Hofmeyr stated that "even making due allowance for anyone being impelled by blood relationship to a zealous veneration for the memory of a great kinsman, I venture to say that the considered verdict of the country as a whole will endorse my view that the late Onze Jan was one of the greatest, if not the greatest, statesman and patriots South Africa has produced".

=== Cape and Transvaal parliamentary roles (1897–1907) ===
In 1897 Hofmeyr became Private Secretary to Dr Thomas Te Water, the Colonial Secretary of the Cape, and then later that year the Clerk Assistant to the Cape House of Assembly. In 1900 Hofmeyr was given the additional role of Registrar of the Special Tribunals Court, and in 1904 was promoted to become the Clerk of the Cape House of Assembly. In 1907 he transferred to the Transvaal Colony, becoming the first Clerk to its House of Assembly upon the formation of its Parliament under responsible government in March 1907.

=== Early writing ===
==== Het Zuid-Afrikaanse Jaarboek (1905–1907) ====
From 1905 Hofmeyr was co-proprietor (with CG Murray) and editor of the annually produced Het Zuid-Afrikaanse Jaarboek en Algemeene Gids. Although the journal was presented only in Dutch, and Hofmeyr was based in Cape Town, the journal provided information on not only the Cape Colony but on all of the other British colonies and protectorates in Southern Africa too - the Transvaal Colony, the Orange River Colony, the Colony of Natal, Southern Rhodesia, and on occasion Basutoland (now Lesotho) and the Bechuanaland Protectorate (now Botswana). In similar vein, the calendar listed both the British King Edward VII's Birthday on 9 November and the Dingaan's Day on 16 December (a day commemorating the victory of 470 Voortrekkers over 20,000 Zulus).

The journal presented a civil servant's view of the world, providing a plethora of useful information. It included a calendar, replete with holy days and public holidays, school holidays in each colony, phases of the moon, times of sunrise, sunset, moonrise and moonset, tide tables and selected references to the Old Testament. Postal rates and money order details were provided. There were calculation tables showing the result of interest rates from 2.5% to 9% on different amounts over different periods in pounds, shillings and pence, tables showing how much different annual sums would provide on a monthly, weekly and daily basis, tables showing the cost of various licences, and tables showing the number of different types of sheep in each district.

Longer articles described the process for the administration of estates in each colony. Census results were listed, showing the breakdown of inhabitants (split into European/ Fingo/ Maleiers/ Hottentot/ Gemengd/ Amaxosa, Zulu and other tribes), church affiliation and populations by town. The Constitution of each colony was set out (including Swaziland (now Eswatini). Members of parliament for each colony were listed, as were civil servants, attorneys and priests. The public debt and annual budget of the Cape Colony was made available. Certain laws were reproduced: irrigation and water laws, hunting laws, legislation providing for half holidays for shopworkers, insolvency laws, workman's compensation laws, agricultural laws, public health laws.

Import and export figures were provided for each colony; the largest exports were gold, diamonds, wool and ostrich feathers. Two thirds of imports were from Great Britain, and almost all exports were to Great Britain. Import tariffs and railway tariffs were presented (including the rule that a short railtruck was permitted to transport no more than 16 ostriches at a time).

The journal carried adverts for banks, food suppliers, hotels, furniture shops, auctioneers, schools (with St. Andrew's College, Grahamstown trumpeting its exclusive annual Rhodes Scholarship), wagons, carriages (no cars), ploughs and other farm machinery, and lastly for "Dr Williams' Pink Pills" (which were advertised as an antidote for almost all known ailments). The journal was not produced after 1907.

==== Closer Union of the South African Colonies (1908) ====
Hofmeyr became increasingly involved in the intellectual debate surrounding the proposed union of the British colonies and protectorates of Southern Africa.

In October 1907 Hofmeyr corresponded with Thomas Barnard Flint, Clerk of the House of Commons of Canada, in relation to the successes of federation in Canada. Flint recommended that South Africa look at the Canadian example, and use the same language relating to federations to allow it to take advantage of existing judicial determinations.

In 1908 Hofmeyr published a pamphlet entitled Closer Union of the South African Colonies, in both English and Dutch. Hofmeyr regarded unification as the best scheme for the needs of the sub-continent but argued (on the strength of his Canadian correspondent) that some measure of federation must precede the bolder unification plan. Hofmeyr suggested that the Orange River Colony take over Basutoland and that the Transvaal be responsible for Swaziland.

Public reaction to the pamphlet was swift. On 24 February 1908 a leader in the Transvaal Weekly complimented Hofmeyr for giving a "useful lead to other minds exercised in the same direction" and his "endeavour to form the basis of a constructive policy which must initiate all genuine progress". The leader believed that union would be the "more effective and expeditious agency in completing the cementing process between the two great white races of South Africa and by a "pooling of the best brains of the two peoples". Hofmeyr argued that "the surrender of local self-government and prejudice must occur gradually" – but the leader criticised this as too timid and lacking boldness. The leader states, "a precarious stepping-stone (federation) is poor security, and liable to submersion when most wanted. Why not build a permanent bridge straightway of guaranteed strength and safety. This is unification".

In March 1908 Hofmeyr received a letter from Marinus Houman (1848–1915), a Dutch-American architect who had been reading the articles on Closer Union in the Transvaal Weekly. Houman advised against federation as it would not meet the aim of an independent united South Africa. Houman's advice was to not leave a "shred of autonomy or independence to any part of your country", and to frame the body politic so that "an injury of one will be the concern of all, i.e. that England cannot injure one part without injuring the whole".

Hofmeyr's pamphlet was attacked in the East London Despatch, as being the views of "those of others holding high political office" or a "ballon d'essai" of General Botha and his friends". At the time, Botha was Prime Minister of the Transvaal. In response, a leader in the Transvaal Weekly of 3 April 1908 remarked that this allegation was "decidedly unfair" and "still more unjust to Mr Hofmeyr to consider that he would act in such a capacity". Further support for Hofmeyr came on 13 April 1908 when Lionel Phillips complimented Hofmeyr's writings, saying he had presented them "in a very thoughtful and in a very dispassionate spirit".

== National Convention (1908–1909) ==
In August 1908 Hofmeyr was appointed secretary for the Transvaal delegation to the National Convention. This placed him in close contact with the leading South African politicians of the day, and the debates held at the national convention strongly influenced and informed his later actions as Administrator of South West Africa.

A consensus had been emerging that the time was right for the merger of the Cape Colony, the Colony of Natal, the Orange River Colony, the Transvaal Colony and perhaps Southern Rhodesia (now Zimbabwe), Northern Rhodesia (now Zambia), Basutholand (now Lesotho), Swaziland Protectorate (now eSwatini and Bechuanaland (now Botswana). In 1908 Jan Smuts, then Colonial Secretary and Education Secretary in the Transvaal government, wrote to John X. Merriman, then Prime Minister of the Cape Colony about the need for a speedy union: during recent months, he said, a dangerous movement had been growing in the Transvaal – a movement for separatism similar to that which had existed before the Boer War.

While Smuts and Merriman agreed on many things, Merriman was concerned about the Native franchise. He predicted that the Cape would not want to give it up, and that the Transvaal and others would not want to adopt it. In February 1908 Merriman suggested to Smuts that their difficulty might be resolved "by leaving the question of the Native franchise to the provinces themselves".

In May 1908 delegations from the colonies met in Pretoria. Smuts moved for a resolution stating that the best interests and permanent prosperity of South Africa could only be secured by an early union of the four colonies under the Crown of Great Britain and that delegates from each of the Cape, Transvaal, Orange River Colony and Natal be sent to a National South African Convention.

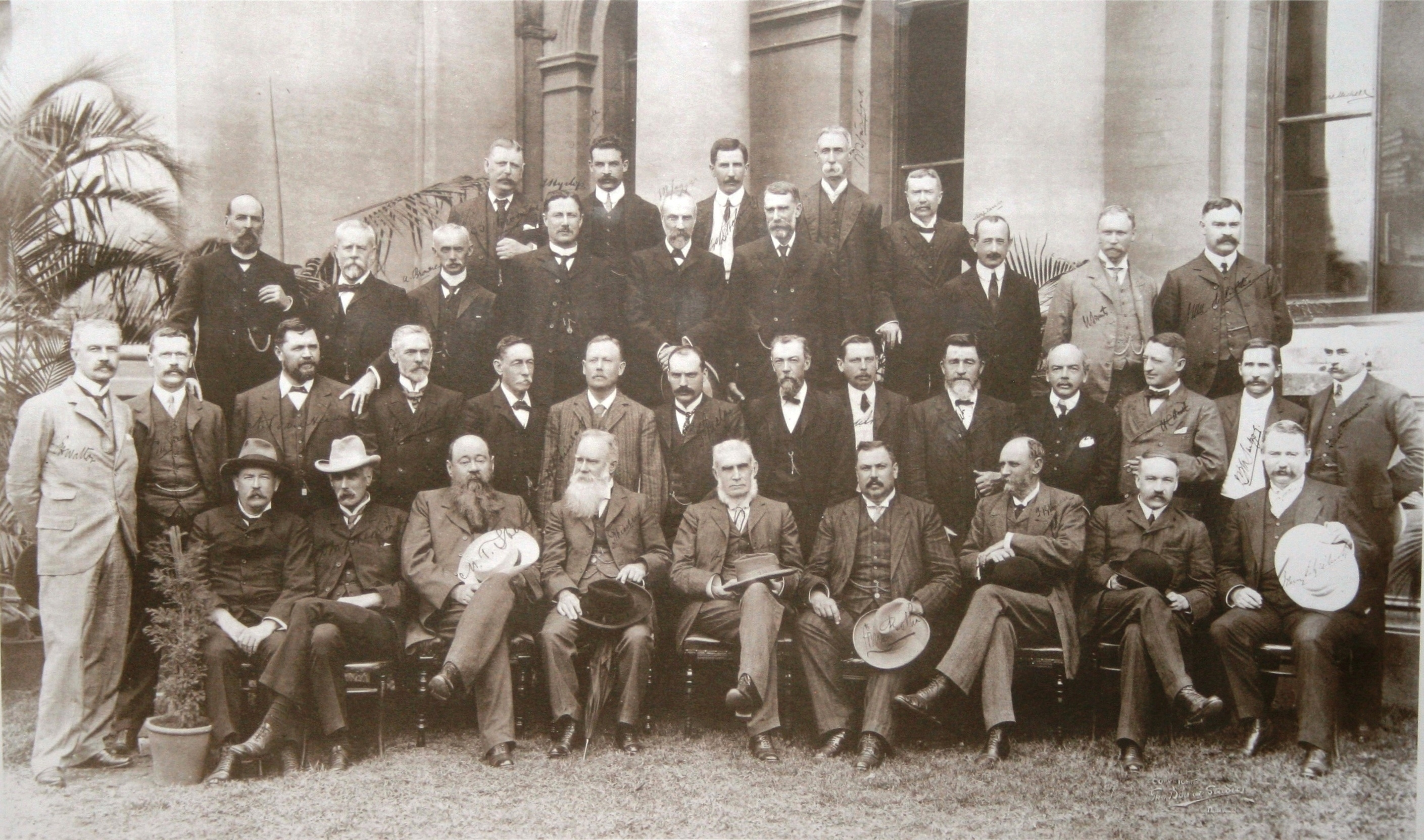
The delegates in Durban, 1908. Hofmeyr second from right in back row

The National Convention first met in October 1908 behind closed doors and open windows in the sultry heat of a Durban summer.

Prominent members of the Transvaal delegation included General Louis Botha, then Prime Minister of the Transvaal and later the first Prime Minister of the Union of South Africa; General Smuts, Colonial Secretary of the Transvaal and later the second Prime Minister of the Union of South Africa (and the prime minister that appointed Gysbert Reitz Hofmeyr as Administrator of South West Africa in 1920); and Sir James Percy Fitzpatrick (a mining financier and author of the classic children's book Jock of the Bushveld), who Smuts had convinced that union would be the fulfilment of the conciliation policy.

Smuts also included General de la Rey in the Transvaal delegation. De la Rey knew nothing about constitutional questions but held the affectionate trust of country-dwelling Afrikaners. The Transvaal delegation went with confidence and the prestige of their colony's economic strength and political stability. Smuts was leaving nothing to chance: they also went with an expert staff of nineteen persons in all, led by Hofmeyr.

The convention was held behind closed doors to foster more open debate and in the fear that a public affair would lead delegates to refuse to compromise on contentious issues. The pressure on the delegates to reach agreement was intense; each delegate knew that a colony which failed to join at once could not expect to obtain ground-floor privileges later.

The Convention sat at Durban from 12 October till 5 November 5, 1908 and then moved to Cape Town from 23 November till February 1909. During the long debates the Transvaalers had all the advantages of wealth and preparedness over their rivals.

The tide flowed strongly in the direction of unification as opposed to federation. The President, Sir Henry de Villiers, had been told much of the weaknesses of even a close federation in the course of a recent visit to Canada.

Neither of the outstanding champions of federalism attended the Convention. Onze Jan Hofmeyr did not attend as he (wrongly) thought that unification had no chance of being carried. William Schreiner, the leader of the Cape Bar, was unable to be there as he was defending Dinuzulu in the Natal courts for his part in the Bambatha rebellion of 1906. Schreiner believed that while such consolidation was important, human rights were vastly more important and so favoured federalism: "To embody in the South African Constitution a vertical line or barrier separating its people upon the ground of colour into a privileged class or cast and an unprivileged inferior proletariat is, as I see the problem, as imprudent as it would be to build a grand building upon unsound and sinking foundations."

Many points were settled without difficulty. Certain provisions were to be entrenched – and would require a two thirds majority to be amended. These included the legal equality of English and Dutch as official languages.

Native policy and who would be entitled to vote were more contentious. Historian Eric Walker relates that a legend found currency at the time that the British authorities virtually dictated the South African bill and that the Cape delegates to the Convention did not really care much about that franchise. In Walker's view this was not so.

The British Liberal ministers brought no pressure to bear to ensure that the dominant Europeans should treat the vast non-European majority better than most of them had done hitherto, though they might have been forgiven had they done so, seeing that the very sessions of the Convention were punctuated by demands for Bantu lands from white men from all the colonies, especially from Natal. The British Liberal ministers merely instructed the Earl of Selborne to make it clear to the Convention through Sir Henry de Villiers that it hoped for a general civilisation franchise. The "civilisation test" would have enfranchised some at least of the non-Europeans in the ex-Republics and conversely would have disenfranchised some poor whites.

This proposed breach with the traditions of the Transvaal and Orange River colonies, and, to a lesser extent, of Natal was too much for the vast majority of the delegates, and it was only with great hesitation that they agreed that the Cape should retain its non-European franchise duly entrenched and that non-Europeans should be allowed to stand for election to the Cape and Natal provincial councils.

Against these concessions, the majority succeeded in imposing a political colour bar to the extent of denying non-Europeans the right of sitting in the exclusively white Union Parliament.

John X. Merriman objected to this colour bar and would not hear of the inclusion of a prayer to Almighty God in a Constitution that embodied a colour bar. When the draft bill was published, Onze Jan Hofmeyr saw to it that his Cape Town branch of the Bond should protest for the same reason. The truth is that the Cape delegates cared deeply about the Cape franchise and made it clear that unless their franchise was entrenched, there would be no Union as far as the Mother Colony was concerned.

The discussions in relation to Native policy and the proper relations between Europeans, Coloureds, Indians and Blacks did not last more than a few days of the four months of constitution-making. The principal emphasis of the discussions were on a far less difficult and far less important issue: the relationship between the two sections of the European population. This prioritization would be replicated in Hofmeyr's approach to governing South West Africa.

Sir Henry de Villiers travelled to London to watch the passage of the bill of union at Westminster. Others went to London with a hope of influencing the British to amend the bill. William Schreiner arrived armed with a petition that a loose federation was the only means of preserving the Cape's more liberal policies, that the incipient colour bar contained in the draft bill was "a blot on the constitution" and that the entrenchment of the Cape non-European franchise was a trap and no safeguard at all. (All the efforts of William Schreiner could not prevent the Natal court from sentencing Dinuzulu to four years imprisonment for his almost involuntary share in the recent Bambata Rebellion.)

Delegations also went to London from the African People's Organisation of Abdullah Abdurahman, and the South African Native National Conference (renamed the African National Congress in 1923), who sent John Tengo Jabavu and Walter Rubusana

In the event none of these protesters were able to affect anything beyond convincing the British public that there were folk of all colours in South Africa who cared greatly for liberty and justice.

Had William Schreiner, Abdullah Abdurahman, John Tengo Jabavu and Walter Rubusana attended the national convention, Hofmeyr might have had substantial exposure to their views, and taken a more enlightened course in his administration of South West Africa.

The convention led to the adoption of the South Africa Act 1909 by the British Parliament and thereby to the creation of the Union of South Africa in 1910.

In 1909 Hofmeyr was appointed as Secretary to the Delimitation Committee which was responsible for finalising the constituency boundaries ahead of the 1910 general election.

== Clerk of the Assembly of the Union of South Africa (1910 to 1920) ==
Hofmeyr was appointed Clerk of the House of Assembly of the newly constituted Union of South Africa, a position he held until 1920. This kept him at the centre of political action in South Africa. As Clerk, Hofmeyr ranked with the Heads of Ministerial Departments.

=== Inner History of the National Convention of South Africa (1912) ===
In 1912 Hofmeyr was asked, as the Clerk of the House of Assembly of the Union and as one of the secretaries to the National Convention, to read and express an opinion as to the impartiality of the record contained in Sir Edgar Harris Walton's proposed book The Inner History of the National Convention of South Africa. Walton had attended the National Convention as one of the Cape delegates. Hofmeyr's report was deferential. "It would be impertinent if I were to profess to be able to criticise the merits of Sir Edgar's work". Nonetheless Hofmeyr did suggest some amendments. Hofmeyr felt emboldened to do so as "there is the extenuating circumstance that, as I had made a somewhat exhaustive study of the history of Closer Union movements in other countries with the view of assisting in the collection of information that might be useful to the Convention, I had taken perhaps a keener interest in the efforts of that body in their endeavours to arrive at a practical solution ... than my ordinary duties as one of the secretaries would have demanded, and for that reason perhaps the proceedings of that great gathering of South African statesmen have left on my mind a deeper and more lasting impression than would probably otherwise have been the case." Walton wrote "Mr Hofmeyr's report is printed as an appendix to the book and it has been thought better to adopt that course rather than to attempt to reconstruct those portions to which Mr Hofmeyr alludes". The book was also certified by Lord de Villiers, the President of the National Convention. Walton notes in an annotation to Hofmeyr's memorandum that he did implement the alterations suggested by Lord de Villiers.

=== Award of the British Order of St Michael and St George (1914) ===
In King George V's 1914 Birthday Honours Hofmeyr was appointed Companion of the Order of St Michael and St George (CMG) in recognition of the services rendered by him as Clerk of the House of Assembly of the Union of South Africa. The award was often made to holders of high office in territories of the British Empire.

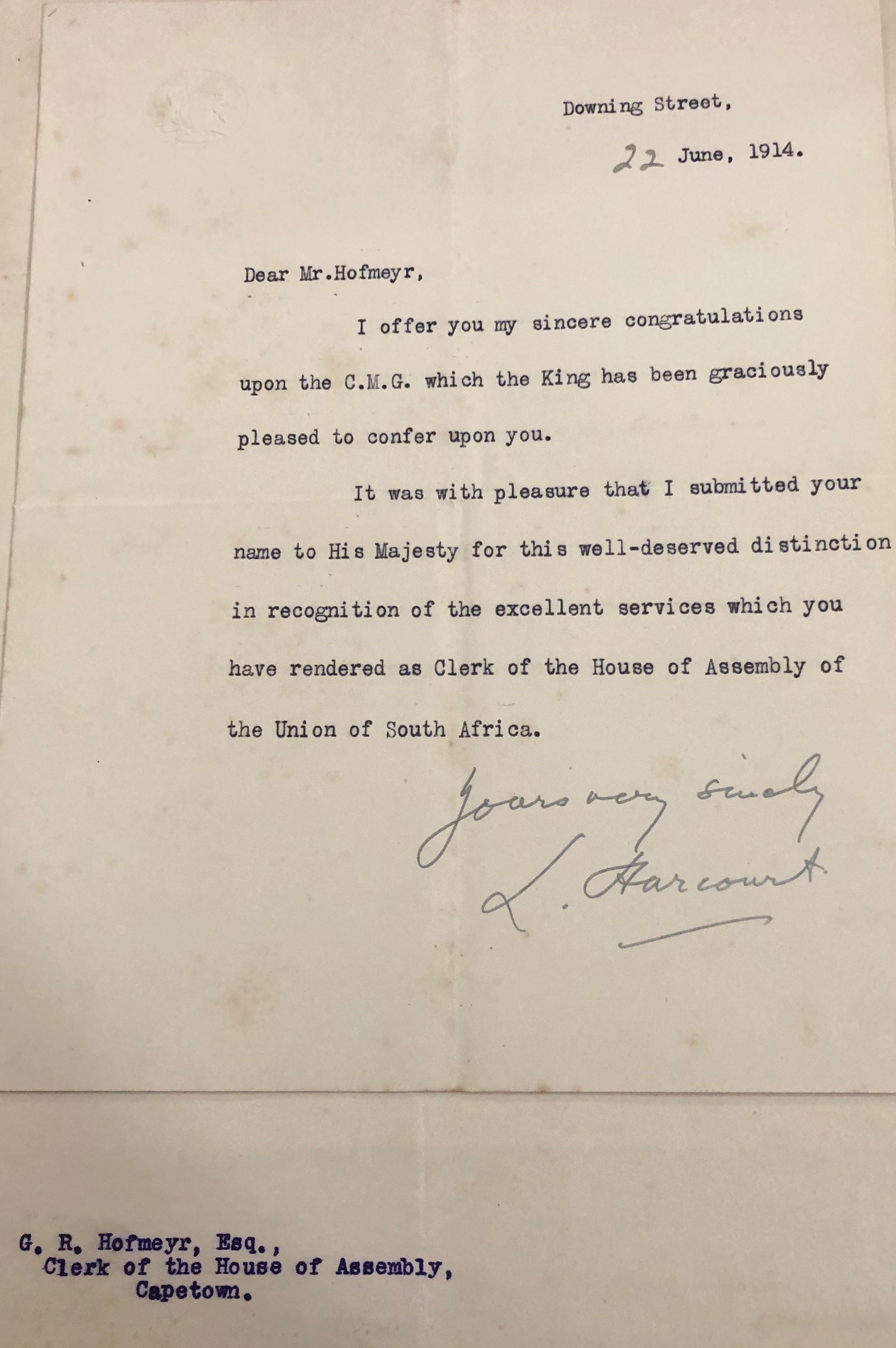
1914 Letter from Downing Street to GR Hofmeyr conferring the title of Companion of the Order of St Michael and St George 22 June 1914

=== Maritz rebellion and the invasion of South West Africa (1914–1915) ===
Following the outbreak of World War I in August 1914, at the request of the British government, General Louis Botha, prime minister of South Africa, agreed to invade German South West Africa. South African troops were mobilised along the border between South Africa and German-controlled South West Africa. Smuts made two important decisions: to use only volunteers for the invasion of South West Africa, and secondly, to take the field himself as military commander. Hofmeyr would mimic both of these decisions when faced with the Bondelswarts Rebellion in 1922. Many of those who had fought in the Boer War regarded Smuts and Botha as traitors for being too close to the British and talk of neutrality swiftly turned into hopes of a clean break with the British empire.

General Beyers, the Commandant-General of the Citizen Force of the Union Defence Force, with whom Hofmeyr had travelled to Europe for military inspections in 1912, was opposed to the South African government's decision to undertake offensive operations against the Germans. Beyers resigned his commission on 15 September 1914. He found support from senator General Koos de la Rey, a Boer general during the Second Boer War who had led the government forces against the white strikers on the Rand earlier in 1914 and was a leading advocate of Boer independence. De la Rey was strongly opposed to South Africa's involvement in World War I on the side of the British and to South Africa's proposed invasion of the German colony of South West Africa, mainly because Germany had supported the Boers during the Second Boer War. Hofmeyr, as secretary to the Transvaal delegation to the National Convention, would have got to know de la Rey well as de la Rey was one of the eight Transvaal delegates. On 15 September Beyers and de la Rey set off together, travelling at night, to visit Major JCG (Jan) Kemp in Potchefstroom. Kemp had resigned his commission and had a large armoury and a force of 2,000 men who had just finished training, many of whom were thought to be sympathetic to the rebels' ideas. Although it is not known what the purpose of their visit was, the South African government believed it to be an attempt to instigate a rebellion. According to General Beyers it was to discuss plans for the simultaneous resignation of leading army officers as protest against the government's actions.

A series of roadblocks had been set by police to capture a criminal gang known as the Foster gang, but the generals' car failed to stop at one of these roadblocks and police fired on the speeding car. General de la Rey and one other were killed. The subsequent judicial enquiry found that the bullet which killed de la Rey had been aimed at the back tyre of his car but had ricocheted after striking the hard road. Many believed that General de la Rey had been assassinated by the government.

Lt-Col Manie Maritz, who was head of a commando of Union forces on the border of German South West Africa, allied himself with the Germans, proclaimed an independent provisional government free from British control and announced that Beyers, Kemp, Maritz and others were to be the first leaders. The South African government declared martial law on 12 October 1914.

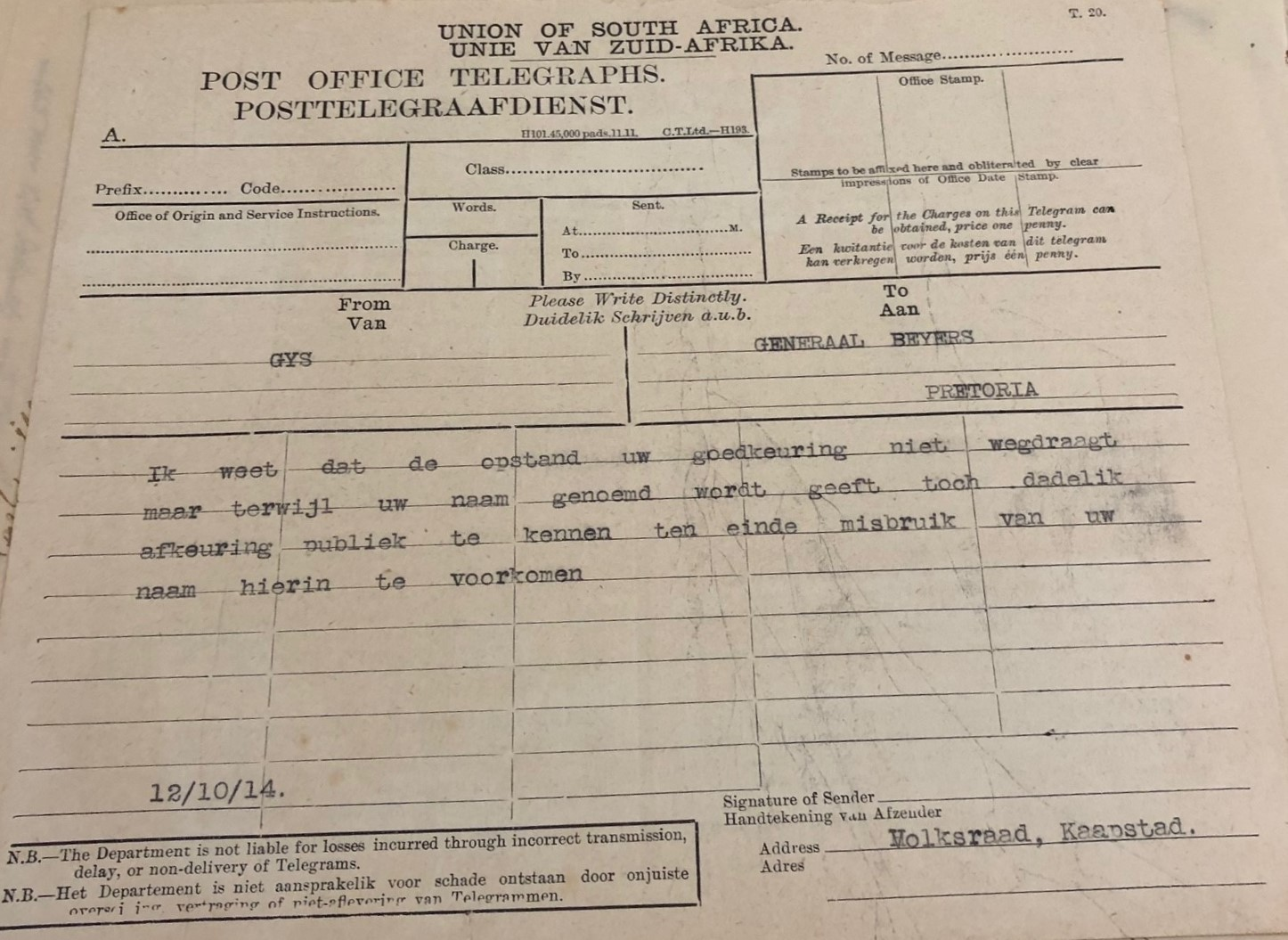
1914 Telegram from GR Hofmeyr to General Beyers 12 October 1914

On 12 October 1914 Hofmeyr sent a telegraph to General Beyers in which Hofmeyr says "Ik weet dat de opstand uw goedkeuring niet wegdraagt maar terwijl uw naam genoemd word geeft toch dadelik afkeuring publiek to kennen ten einde misbruik van uw naam hierin to voorkomen" (I know the uprising does not have your approval, but while your name is mentioned, immediately publicly disapprove in order to prevent abuse of your name in this.) Hofmeyr's plea went unanswered and Beyers ignored the request. Hofmeyr's personal papers include a note in which he says he showed the telegraphic correspondence to WA Hofmeyr of attorneys Bisset & Hofmeyr in Adderley Street, and asked WA Hofmeyr to appeal to Steyn and Beyers. "As we were close friends, his reply shocked me beyond measure. He said "Ek sal dit .. nie doen nie. Ek keur die rebellie goed. Botha en Smuts se nekke moet gebreek word" (I will not do that. I approve of the rebellion. Botha and Smuts' necks must be broken). Hofmeyr continued: "I remonstrated with him to no purposes and thus ended most regrettably a valued personal friendship."

In the event, Botha and General Jan Smuts (de la Rey's old comrades and fellow members of the Transvaal delegation to the National Convention) commanded forces loyal to the Government which greatly outnumbered the rebels and were able to swiftly put down the rebellion. Before the fighting was over Beyers was drowned as his horse was shot under him while he was trying to escape across the Vaal River. The leading Boer rebels who were captured got off relatively lightly with terms of imprisonment of six and seven years and heavy fines. Two years later they were released from prison. One notable exception was Jopie Fourie, who had failed to resign his commission before joining the rebellion. He was executed. While the rebellion was crushed, its legacy of bitterness provided part of the political capital which put the National Party under Hertzog into office after the first world war and contributed to Hofmeyr's defeat as the candidate for Riversdale in the 1929 general election.

After the Maritz rebellion was suppressed, the South African army continued their operations into German South West Africa. The South Africans defeated the Germans by July 1915. It was a war without any real battles, and the South African casualties for the whole campaign totalled 113 killed and 311 wounded. The German losses were very similar: 103 killed, 890 taken prisoner, 37 field guns and 22 machine guns captured.

South Africa had become a self-governing British dominion in 1910, but the symbols of conquest deployed in South West Africa: the Union Jack and a banner proclaiming "Britannia still rules the waves" raised in Windhoek remained those of the British Empire.

=== "An Undivided White South Africa: the Ideal Union" (1916) ===
After the bitterness and heightened emotions of the Maritz rebellion, in 1916 Hofmeyr produced a short pamphlet, in both English and in Dutch, entitled "An Undivided White South Africa: The Ideal Union and how it may be achieved". In it, Hofmeyr sets out a plan to create a student "bond" or society, to foster closer union between English and Dutch (and other European) school students. By way of support, letters of commendation of the plan are included, from FW Reitz (President of the South African Senate), Joel Krige (Speaker of the South African House of Assembly), and from the Superintendent of Education in each of the four provinces. Each letter commends the plan, with Reitz praising the "patriotic work", Krige being "deeply impressed with the nobility of the ideal", commenting that it is "clear that you have given deep and anxious thought", and others commending Hofmeyr's "removal of the causes of racial animosity and strife".

Hofmeyr's scheme aimed to foster closer understanding and harmony between English and Dutch children. Methods were suggested to create "fusion from the present confusion", to dispel misunderstanding because "distrust is born of ignorance", and to nurture adults "free from racial animosities".

The scheme's stated objectives were to encourage respect for the Constitution, a thorough knowledge of the English and Dutch languages, mutual respect between English and Dutch, interest in South African history (and the histories of England and the Netherlands), closer contact between the child of the town and the child of the veld, pride in all great South Africans (and the purchase of portraits of them by schools), love of South African fauna, flora, scenery, climate, and interest in South African literature and arts.

Under the plan students would be encouraged "to listen willingly to each other's versions", explore the historical origin of names, and accept that "the Dutch boy is not a rebel in embryo and that the English boy is not a jingo in the growing".

In the foreword, Hofmeyr asserted that the scheme was "entirely divorced from political questions". Nonetheless, there was embedded in the pamphlet a strong political programme of drawing the English and Dutch closer together, to "weld these two races into one", and to reduce the separate identities dividing the English and Dutch.

While the main focus is on English and Dutch groups, "other European children were also invited to co-operate".

Hofmeyr did not extend the understanding and co-operation to include all children in South Africa. Hofmeyr ignored that one of the tenets of civilisation, and of the Christianity invoked in the Foreword of the pamphlet, is to treat all men and women equally. Most other white leaders at the time would also have failed to do so, but there were some (such as JW Sauer and Olive Schreiner) who would have included all children in the scheme.

Hofmeyr's aim in the pamphlet is to build up "a thoroughly united and consequently dominant white nation". He worries that "continued and permanent division of the white population must inevitably lead to their ruin. Even united, their mental and moral resources will be sorely taxed to retain that supremacy which it is essential should be preserved in a land with a vast number of inhabitants to whom civilisation has yet to be extended". Hofmeyr asserts that non-whites are not yet "civilised" but implicitly acknowledges their worth by fearing that white supremacy is at risk.

Foreshadowing the language that would be used by the League of Nations in relation to the South West Africa Mandate, Hofmeyr speaks about the duties of the Dutch and the English as the "trustees of civilisation". However tempting it is to dream about the removal of the "white" or "European" limitations of the pamphlet, and to postulate how impressive it would have been had Hofmeyr been proposing that all children in South Africa, of whatever colour, should "listen willingly to each other's versions", dispel the "distrust born of ignorance", and "remove the causes of racial animosity and strife", if Hofmeyr had framed the pamphlet in those terms he would have joined a very small group of enlightened whites at the time. Even the letters of commendation speak glowingly of "improving the relationship between the two great white races" without any thought of the relationships with others in South Africa. Hofmeyr was not alone in seeking reconciliation and co-operation between whites only.

The pamphlet drew positive correspondence from numerous sources in South Africa, including a Scottish teacher at the Potchefstroom High School for Boys.

Hofmeyr continued throughout this time to be interested in constitutional affairs and was regarded as an expert. In January 1920 Thomas Watt, from the office of the Minister of the Interior, writes to Hofmeyr thanking him for agreeing to write an article on the Union constitution.

Hofmeyr's expressed objective was "to effect union of the white people so as to have a strong and happy nation, maintaining their virility, ruling themselves and a contented Native population in the common interests of all... governed in such a manner that the vast resources of the land might be developed ... in such a way that peace and good order be continuously maintained within, and security provided against attack from without, so that the new commonwealth would add to and not draw on the strength of the Empire of which it would form part."

Hofmeyr's ideals would soon be tested with his appointment as Administrator of South West Africa.

=== Hofmeyr's views on language ===
Hofmeyr was fluent in both Dutch and English, often publishing in both languages simultaneously. In Hofmeyr's private papers his letters to and from family are mainly in Dutch but include parts in English.

Hofmeyr was less tolerant of Afrikaans. In 1919 Hofmeyr wrote to Dr Steytler, the priest of the Dutch Reformed Church in Mouille Point, saying that he supported Dr Steytler in seeking to maintain Dutch (as opposed to Afrikaans) as the language of the church. Hofmeyr spoke in the letter of "onze prachtige taal – de taal der edelste en diepste gedachten van onze voorouders"(our beautiful language – the language of the noblest and deepest thoughts of our forefathers).

== Administrator of South West Africa (1920–1926) ==
After South Africa had defeated the German forces in South West Africa in 1915 it declared martial law and assumed the administration of the territory.

The German record in South West Africa was indefensible. Ruth First describes it as one of insatiable plunder first, and then, when stung beyond endurance the tribes rebelled, of ruthless, wild repression in a fury of revenge and fear.

The years of martial law were, in many ways, a time of hope for the African population, many of whom genuinely expected that the new colonial masters would return land confiscated by the Germans.

The new South African military administration introduced a number of reforms, which were not motivated by any commitment to humanitarianism or Cape liberalism but rather from South Africa's desire to be permitted to retain South West Africa after the war ended. The South Africans abolished flogging as a punishment for workers, removed the settlers' "right of paternal correction", raised the age at which Africans were compelled to carry passes from seven to fourteen, and rescinded the ban on African ownership of livestock (but not land).

Non-whites without land were given temporary Reserves on vacant farmland of good quality within their former tribal areas, and were protected from ill treatment at the hands of their former masters. This treatment, and the promises made by Viscount Buxton, the Governor-General of South Africa, left the Blacks and Coloureds with the impression that their tribal areas taken by the Germans would be returned to them.

The new military administration began a post mortem on German rule. Special criminal courts tried historic cases of brutal treatment and killings by German whites of Africans. The courts took cognizance of but also railed against the former right of any German master to punish any servant.

Ovamboland had remained outside of the area of German police surveillance (the "Police Zone") and whites were not allowed access. The Ovambos were more numerous than the entire population of the Police Zone; armed and coherently organised, the Ovambos were far too serious a military obstacle to be challenged by the limited military power that had been available to the German governor. However, the South African military extended control over Ovamboland in 1917.

=== League of Nations Mandate ===
In 1918 Lloyd George announced that the "desire and wishes of the peoples must be the dominant factor" in determining the fate of the German colonies. "The Natives live in their various tribal organisations under chiefs and councils who are competent to consult and speak for their tribes and members and thus to represent their wishes and interests... the general principle of national self-determination is therefore as applicable in their case as those of occupied European territories".

South West Africa's fate was decided as part of the peace negotiations after World War I. Notwithstanding Lloyd George's grand promise of self-determination, the Great Powers heading the thirty-two countries forming the League of Nations were not ready to permit the Natives of South West Africa (or other former German possessions) to decide how they should be governed. The Great Powers resolved that no territory taken from the defeated nations should be treated as spoils of war. They were to be territories under Mandate, the Mandatories to be answerable to the League for the well-being of the aboriginal people inhabiting them. Britain had already paved the way for this decision.

==== The British "Blue Book" (1918) ====
To make sure that the indigenous populations would "self-determine" in favour of the British, Walter Long, the Colonial Secretary in 1918 sent secret telegrams to Viscount Buxton, the Governor-General of South Africa and others requesting them to provide "evidence of anxiety of Natives to live under British rule".

Long received this reply from Buxton: "I cannot see how the principle of national self-determination could be applied to South West Africa .... Almost all sections of the Union would keenly resent the return of the Colony to the Germans and that would be politically disastrous, and while the Natives ... would almost all certainly elect to remain under British rule they could hardly be given a more influential voice than the German inhabitants."

A plebiscite for South West Africa was never arranged.

Instead, in 1918, Britain published as a British Government Blue Book a "Report on the Natives of South West Africa and their Treatment by Germany" which had been prepared by the Administrator in Windhoek.

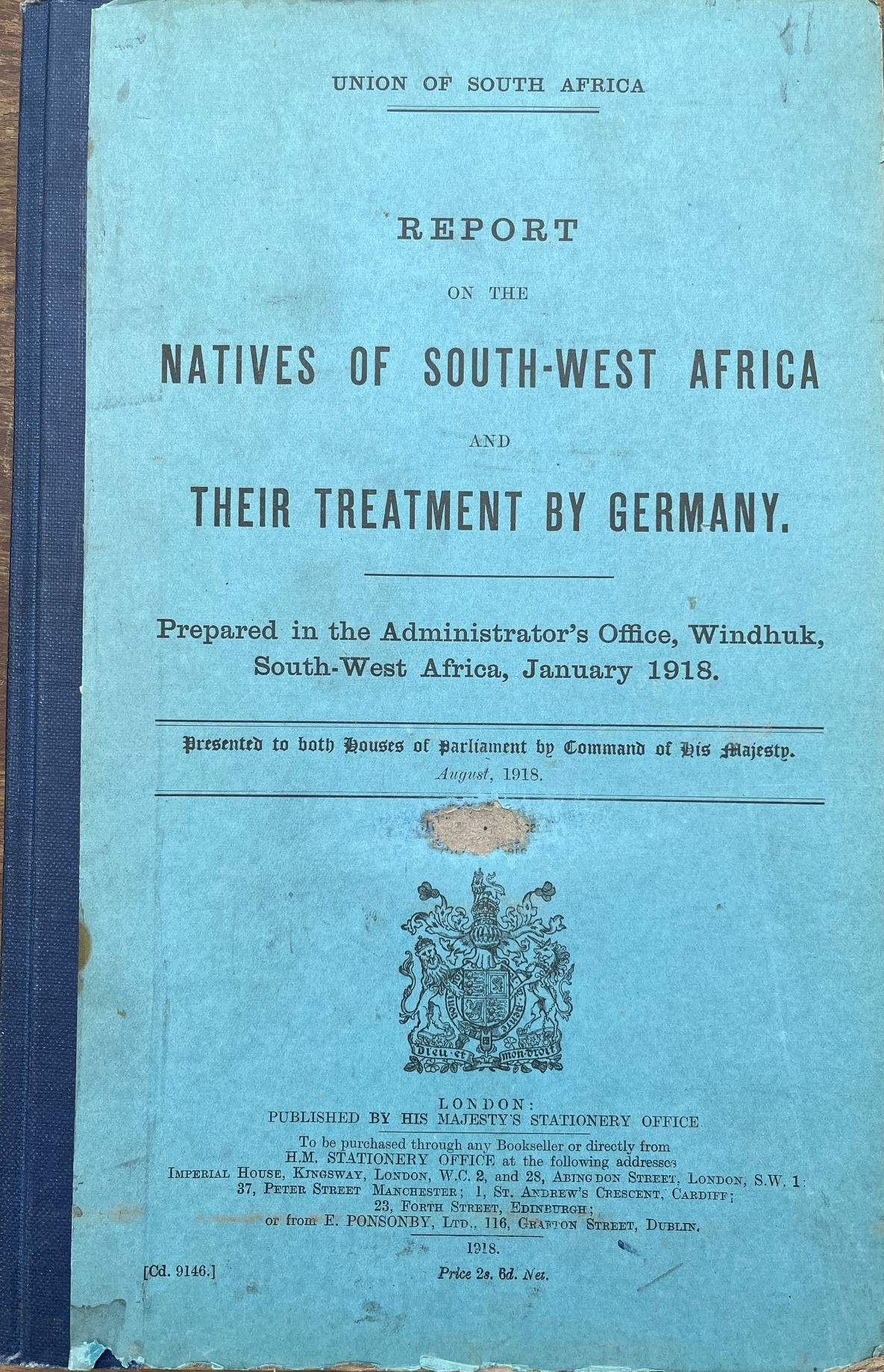
1918 British Blue Book Report on the Natives of South-West Africa and their Treatment by Germany

A special Commission of Enquiry had been appointed to gather and examine accounts of conditions under German rule. The findings, the story of the German military operations against the tribes, was published in the Blue Book, which carefully reported the killing of prisoners, women, girls and little boys, and of men and women who had surrendered dying at the hands of soldiers and labour overseers in camps and by the lash. The Blue Book contained photographs of the crude executions, neck chains, leg and arm fetters, the flayed backs of women prisoners, and Herero refugees returning starved from the desert.

The Blue Book retold the story of how in 1904, when the Herero took up arms, the Germans had the Maxim and quick-firing Krupp guns which were used to shatter the rebellion. Theodor Leutwein might at that point have negotiated peace, but before he had an opportunity to do so was replaced by General von Trotha, of Chinese Boxer rebellion notoriety. Von Trotha was not prepared to make peace until he had made a salutary example of the rebels. Herero chiefs, summoned from the field to discuss peace terms, were simply shot. Von Trotha then threw a cordon across the land to seal off all escape routes and issued his notorious extermination order which required the killing of every Herero man, woman and child.

Von Trotha's proclamation was brutal: "The Herero people must now leave the country... every Herero, with or without a rifle, will be shot. I will not take over any more women and children, but I will either drive them back to their people or have them fired on".

Thousands of Natives were held in the Shark Island concentration camp, where prisoners were held in fenced enclosures on the beach. Of 2,000 Nama prisoners placed on Shark Island in September 1906, 860 died from scurvy within the first four months.

Theodor Leutwein later recorded the colonizer's post-war estimate: "at the cost of several hundred millions of marks and several thousand German soldiers we have, of the three business assets of the protectorate – mining, farming and Native labour – destroyed the second entirely and two-thirds of the last". The Herero population had been reduced from over 80,000 cattle-rich tribesmen to 15,000 starving fugitives; more than half the Nama and Berg-Damara had died.

Wellington is of the view that the Blue Book was nothing more than blatant propaganda for the purpose of preventing the return of the colony to Germany after the conclusion of the war. However, much of the Blue Book simply comprised translations of official reports of the Germans up to 1915.

Nonetheless, Wellington notes that the report was hypocritical, given that much of the treatment of the Natives of South West Africa by the Germans can be paralleled in British colonial history.

Germany had responded to the Blue Book by producing its own "White Book", published in Germany in 1919, ("Die Behandling der eiheimishen Befolkerung in den Kolonialen Besitzsungen Deutschlands und Englands"). This report spotlights the worst events in British Colonial History, alleging that the British were as culpable as the Germans in South West Africa.

Wellington is forthright: "Let it be said at once that much of this indictment of Britain is true and it would be an ignorant and unworthy Briton who did not recognise the mistakes, the blunders, and the cruelties which stain the pages of British colonial history".

The ruthlessness of British military measures on certain occasions is incontrovertible. Field Marshall Garnet Wolseley showed no mercy at Tel-el-Kebir, nor Kitchener at Omdurman.

Ruth First notes that the pacification of Algeria by the French, the rule of King Leopold's rubber regime in the Congo, the exploitation by the Portuguese, English and Dutch of the slave-trade on the west coast of Africa, were all no less ugly.

Many other examples might have been given. Historian Caroline Elkins mentions Boris Johnson's remark that over the last two hundred years Britain had invaded 178 countries – most of the members of the United Nations. Elkins then considers the Jallianwala Bagh massacre in Amritsar in 1919, the aerial bombing by the Royal Air Force during the Iraqi Revolt in 1920, the Irish War of Independence between 1919 and 1921, and the suppression of the 1919 Egyptian revolution. Historian John Newsinger in a chapter dealing with the use of excessive force by the British in the period 1916 to 1926 adds the Shanghai massacre of 1925.

Elkins shows that such actions by the British did not end in the 1920s. Elkins recounts British actions in the 1936-1939 Arab revolt in Palestine, the Bengal famine of 1943, the atrocities committed in the suppression of the Mau Mau rebellion in Kenya in the 1950s, in the Malayan emergency from 1948 to 1960, and in the Cyprus emergency between 1955 and 1959, amongst others.

Ruth First assessed that Germany as a colonial power suffered from two substantial handicaps. It had entered the race in the last stages of colonisation, at a time when international morality had at last opened its eyes. What others had done before her, in secret or silence, she could not do without discovery and assault. Her second handicap was simply that she suffered defeat. When Britain and South Africa put on display the results of Germany's colonial policy, it was not because they wanted to champion the African cause, but because they wanted to discredit the German one.

This was the fraught context in which Hofmeyr received his appointment as Administrator of South West Africa.

Under the Mandate, Hofmeyr would have at least one of the handicaps suffered by the Germans: his actions would not be done in secret or in silence – they would be closely and independently monitored by the Mandates Commission. Furthermore, the League of Nations had established principles by which Hofmeyr would be expected to govern, and to which he could be held to account.

==== Article 22 of the Covenant and Article 2 of the Mandate ====
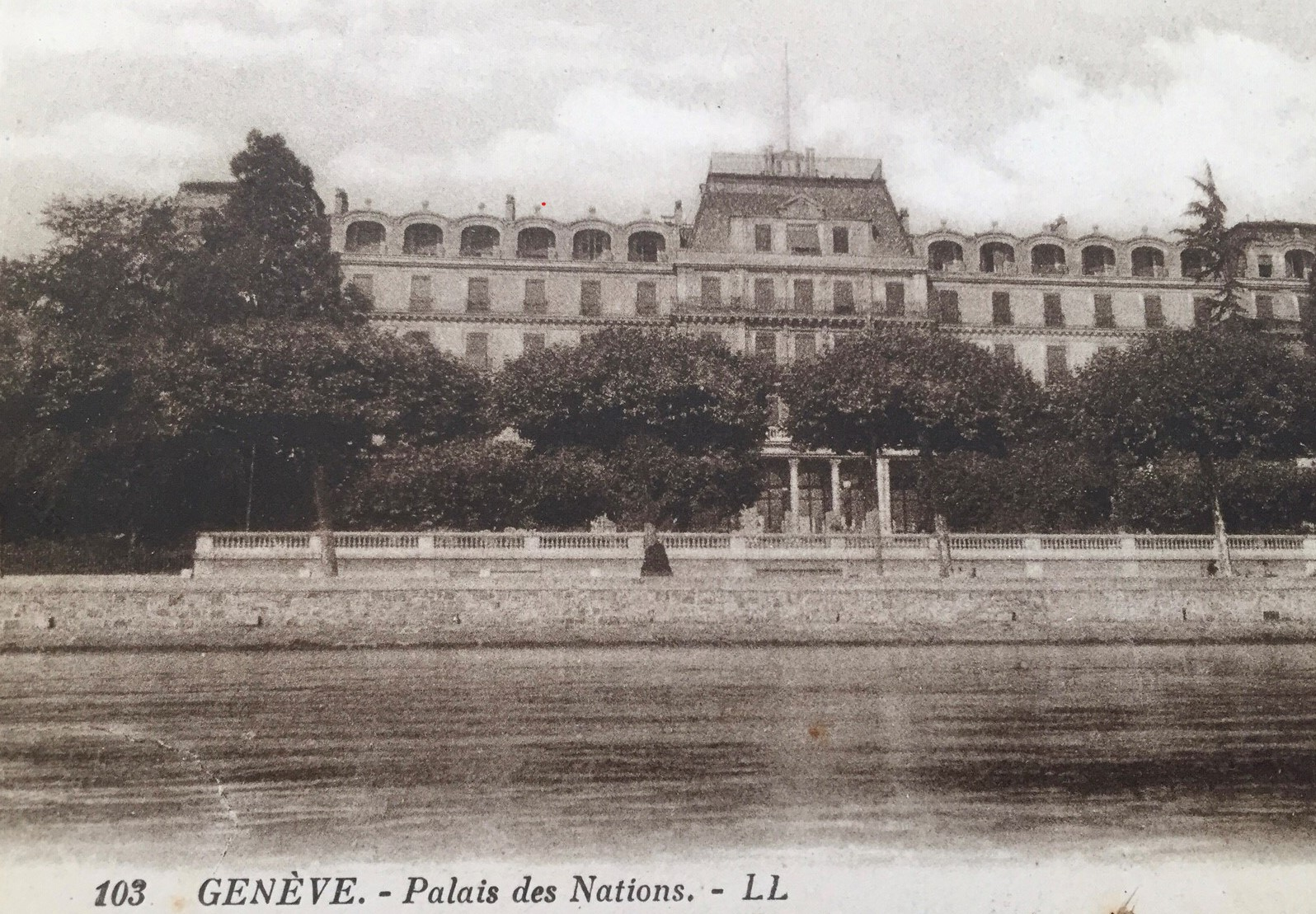
Palace of Nations, the original home of the League of Nations in Geneva, where the Mandates Commission convened in the 1920s

The Mandate for South Africa to administer South West Africa, once agreed, took some time to come into effect. World War I hostilities ended on 11 November 1918. On 7 May 1919 it was agreed that South Africa would be the Mandatory power, although the Treaty of Versailles itself was only signed on 28 June 1919, and the Covenant of the League of Nations only became effective on 10 January 1920.

Under Article 22 of the Covenant certain "advanced nations" were mandated to administer on behalf of the League colonies and territories which as a consequence of World War I ceased to be governed by Germany and other defeated nations and which were "inhabited by peoples not yet able to stand by themselves under the strenuous conditions of the modern world". Each Mandatory was entrusted with the tutelage of such under-developed peoples and Article 22 stated that "the well-being and development of such peoples form a sacred trust of civilisation".

Each Mandatory was obliged to render to the Mandates Commission an annual report in respect of the territory committed to its charge. The Mandates Commission sat in Geneva and met twice a year. The majority of members consisted of non-Mandatory Powers.

For the first time, the administration of colonies and territories would, under the Mandate, be subject to independent international scrutiny by the Mandates Commission and not only review by the colonial power itself. The Mandatory would not be marking its own homework.

The Mandate to administer South West Africa was given to "His Brittanic Majesty to be exercised on his behalf by the Government of the Union of South Africa".

Under Article 2 of the Mandate for German South West Africa the Mandatory was obliged to "promote to the utmost the material and moral well-being and social progress of the inhabitants of the territory". Furthermore, "the Mandatory shall see that ... no forced labour is permitted except for essential public works and services, and then only for adequate remuneration".

Under the South African Treaty of Peace and South West Africa Mandate Act 1919, the administration of South West Africa was delegated by the South African parliament to the Governor General, who would exercise his functions through the Administrator of South West Africa appointed by the South African government.

=== Appointment of Hofmeyr as Administrator of South West Africa ===
South West Africa remained under martial law until September 1920.

Hofmeyr c. 1920

Smuts, at this point Prime Minister of South Africa, chose Hofmeyr to inaugurate a civil regime with effect from 1 October 1920, and appointed him for a five year term. The salary was set at £2,000 per year (around £112,500 in 2024 money). Remuneration included a free residence in Windhoek and such local allowances as pertained to the office at such time, around the same as the Administrator of one of the smaller Provinces in SA. This represented a substantial increase from his salary of £1,584 per year at the time of his appointment.

Hofmeyr had benefitted from a strong recommendation given by John X Merriman to Smuts.

In early December 1920 Merriman wrote to Hofmeyr. "How are you getting on with your Natives? Judging from faint rumbles that come through the press you will have your work cut out." Merriman then recommends a book, The Black Problem, by Davidson Don Tengo Jabavu, the son of John Tengo Jabavu, with the recommendation that the author is "worth a wilderness of Sol Plaatjes". Merriman goes on to say that Davidson Don Tengo Jabavu is "a follower of Booker Washington of the school of work and discipline and not Du Bois and his inflated followers who thinks that salvation comes from high falutin grumbling. I wish you could get some institution like Tuskegee and someone to manage it".

In the same letter, Merriman's political acuteness is revealed: "You are going to have fine times with the League of Nations and their Mandates Commission, I fear. However, my dear Excellency, I do not want to cry wolf – and at any rate you, if any one, knows the stuff of which we politicians are made."

The Cape Times greeted the appointment of Hofmeyr with approval. "It will readily be understood that ... Mr Hofmeyr's wide knowledge of constitutional forms and precedents gained as Joint Secretary in the National Convention and in the past ten builder years of the Union Parliament will be of the utmost value.... though in the House of Assembly, where he has so admirably fulfilled his important functions as Clerk of the House, he will be sorely missed, the Administrative duties to which he is to be called in the new Territory, the task of building up a civil administration and of helping to weld South West Africa into the system of the Union is one which, however, anxious and difficult it may be, must make a powerful appeal to the imagination as well as to the intellect."

Elsewhere in the Cape Times on 3 August 1920 it was reported that "No one can doubt that the appointment, from a public point of view, is a wise one... [Hofmeyr] possesses a charm of manner and a kindness of heart which are bound to win the confidence and esteem of those with whom he will have official dealings in the South-West Protectorate... Courteous to all, he has been ever ready to help anyone over a difficulty when occasion demanded".

However, the appointment was not met with universal approval. In Hofmeyr's papers there is an undated clipping from an unnamed newspaper (with the handwritten note "please destroy"). The article noted that Sir Howard Gorges will cease as Administrator of South West Africa and may be asked to be High Commissioner of South Africa in London, "a post that calls for far-seeing intelligence, initiative, forcefulness, tact, and administrative ability, and of these Sir Howard Gorges is a happy combination".

After lavishing praise on Sir Howard Gorges the article was decidedly lukewarm about Hofmeyr's appointment, saying that "the selection ... scarcely carries conviction with those who understand the peculiar requirements and the uncommon difficulties of the Administratorship of South-West."

Hofmeyr's previous roles as secretary to the Transvaal delegation and clerk of the House of Assembly had required him to operate at a high-level but he had never been the principal decision maker and his appointment as Administrator may have left him feeling out of his depth. In a letter written to Smuts on 14 December 1920, Hofmeyr seems to be under pressure and is struggling to keep up. "I am kept busy from 6am to 11pm (sometimes later).... I am bound to say that the official atmosphere is still so pregnant with Martial Law odours that perhaps something more than disinfectants (which I have used judiciously but freely) is advisable..... I am deeply steeped in the complicated diamond question about which I have been feeling most anxious. I want to feel that all our interests are reasonably secured before Martial Law is raised. In this matter I have been greatly handicapped. A novice myself, I get very little help here. Herbst knows next to nothing; he says Gorges did not take him into his confidence. Frood is good but all a new-comer... I have had the unpleasant duty to send back to the Union one senior official, to reprimand two others and to dismiss several."

Hofmeyr's frustration with his support team does mirror the experience of Gorges. Hancock reports that while Smuts was lucky in finding an experienced colonial administrator to put in charge of South West Africa in 1915, Gorges felt himself constrained many times to complain to Smuts about the poor quality of his subordinates in the administration and police.

==== Hofmeyr's early ambitions for South West Africa ====
Hofmeyr set out his ambitions for South West Africa in an official Memorandum dated 4 January 1921, issued only a few months after his arrival in Windhoek as Administrator.

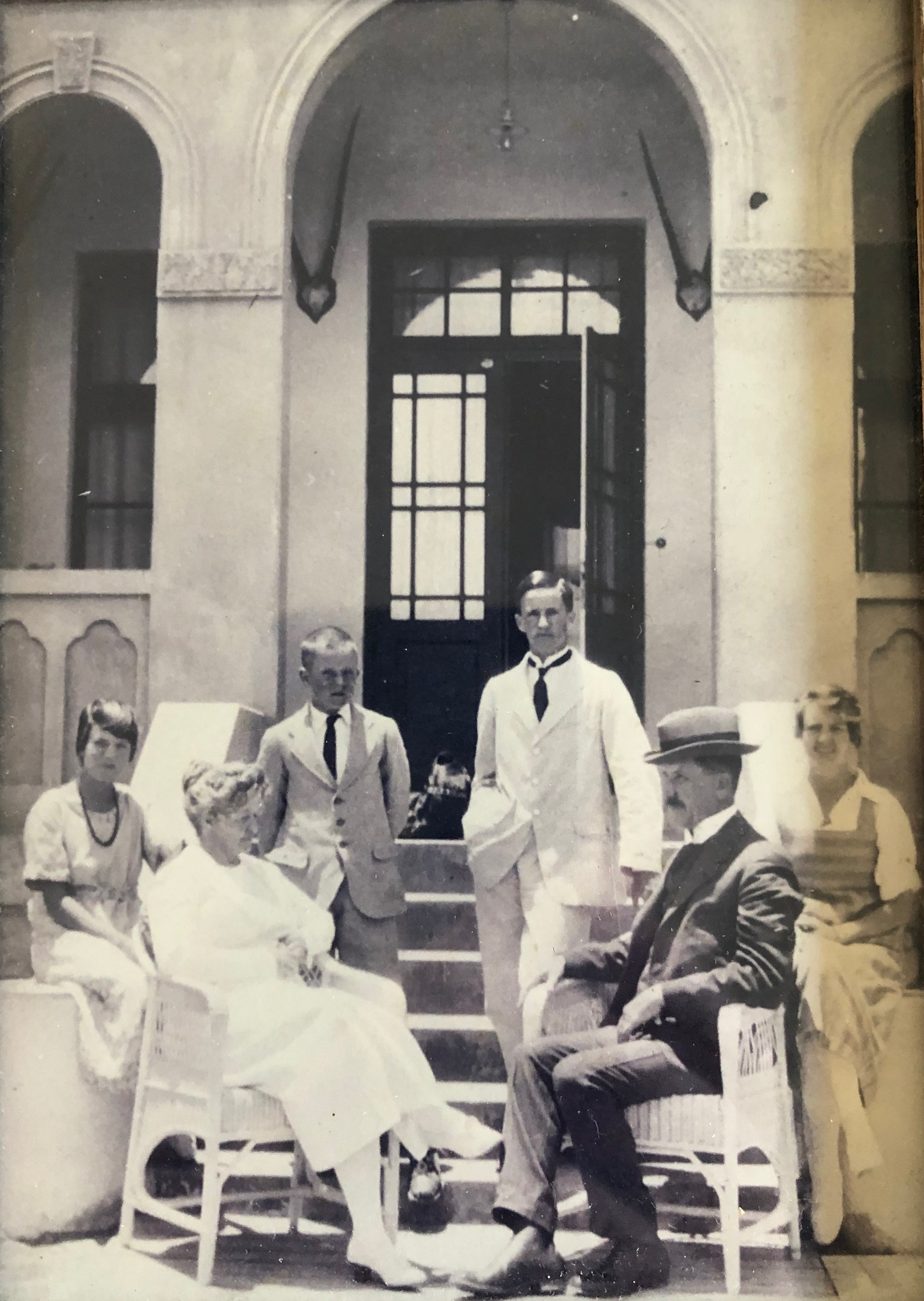
Hofmeyr with his wife Ydie Nel and their four children at the official residence of the Administrator in Windhoek, 1920

Hofmeyr noted that the Germans in South West Africa were upset with his view that "the future destiny of South-West Africa was identical with that of the Union of South Africa of which it had already become an integral or inseparable portion".

Hofmeyr suggested that as political rights and citizenship go together, German residents be regarded as British subjects by proclamation (following a precedent set in 1795 when the Dutch at the Cape were proclaimed to be British subjects) and later to be recommended by the 1921 Constitutional Commission).

However, "in the case of the Coloured and Native population, the question of the extension to them of the franchise should for the present not be considered. They will, however, also be declared to be Union subjects". No explanation for the exclusion of Coloureds and Natives from voting was given.

On education, Hofmeyr stated that he realised "the importance of one school system for European children", and desires that wherever possible tri-lingual teachers (English/ Dutch/ German) be appointed. "Some form of education for the children of Coloured employees who hail from the Union cannot be much longer delayed". No mention was made of Black education in the memorandum.

On land, Hofmeyr's focus would be the speed with which he could introduce white settlers. "I have bestowed much thought on the best and quickest way to get settlers on to the land and I have come to the conclusion that by a forward policy in the direction of dam construction such settlement of two thirds of the Territory could be accomplished in less than one third of the time it will take under the present system of boring for water... I am expediting the gazettal and allocation of farms as much as possible... Since 25 February 1920 when the Land Settlement Act came into force up to 31 December 1920, some 310 farms have been actually gazetted and the gazettal of 82 more is in the hands of the printer... There is urgent need for considering the quickest means of getting suitable people who desire to take up farming here on to the land".

Hofmeyr was firmly against racial mixing: "I may mention here that shortly after I took office I instructed the Land Board to insert a condition in every grant to the effect that if an allottee marries or habitually cohabits with a Coloured or Native woman he is liable to have his grant cancelled." How this complied with his Christian principles was not elucidated.

Hofmeyr grappled with the "Native question". In a statement that would become a constant refrain of his, he stated: "The Native question ... in South-West Africa is synonymous with the labour question".

The Native question "is one of considerable difficulty, for which the Natives are least of all to blame. They have been the unfortunate victims of untoward circumstances. Their former official masters failed to understand them for ... they were sometimes very harshly treated, while at other times, the treatment was such as to bewilder a people whose mental equipment was unequal to the task of grasping such divergent methods... These unhappy people are therefore to be pitied rather than blamed where today they exhibit a spirit which is out of proper perspective...".

However, this sympathetic approach was not sustained. " I found ... that the Native drew ... a sharp distinction between a German and a Union citizen and this differentiating attitude towards the white man... must be corrected at the earliest possible moment". The fact that the Native may have had cause to make such a distinction as a result of treatment detailed in the Blue Book does not occur to Hofmeyr – the attitude was something to be "corrected" in the cause of white unity.

Hofmeyr struggled to enunciate clear policies, and what he was willing to give with one hand he then tried to take back with the other. "I want to see that the aged and the women and children are well cared for and have comfortable places of abode. I want also to see that the Native who by hard work and thrift has got stock together shall have good grazing and good water for his stock. But I also want to see that there shall be no idleness which only leads to crime and punishment."

"Just as every white man has to work, so every Native must also work. Above all, they must take my advice and have nothing to do with political agitators. In times of stress and difficulty the Natives can look to me for help and protection, but on the other hand the Natives must help by working on the farms to so develop the country so that there will be food for all when hard times overtake us."

For Hofmeyr, the Natives' right to fair treatment was conditional on willingness to work. "I will see that [the Natives] are well treated if they go and work and that they are paid their wages and get good food, but then I expect the Chiefs and Headmen to see that there is no idleness and that the Natives contribute their share towards making South-West Africa a good and happy country for all."

Hofmeyr was aware of the plethora of harsh laws that the Germans had introduced and expressed a desire not to repeat them. "It is because I want to avoid making ugly laws for the people that I am sending the commission to explain to them the position and to advise me as to the reasons why all the Natives who can work are not working".

Nonetheless, during his Administration Hofmeyr passed numerous "ugly laws" to ensure that Natives became available as labourers on the white owned farms, mines and elsewhere.

Hofmeyr's views on Native risings reveal his indecisiveness. He bemoaned the fact that "the usual rumours of a Native rising have been floated about for weeks past and old inhabitants have urged upon me the inadvisability of moving from Windhoek without a bodyguard. I have assured these kind friends that as I was sincerely endeavouring to see that justice was done to the Natives, I feared no harm from them, did not view seriously any probability of a Native rising, and had no intention when moving about the country of increasing the discomfort by a dust-raising bodyguard which would be more likely to promote trouble than avert it." Despite this bravado, later in the Memorandum Hofmeyr acknowledged reports that some Natives are discontent and may rebel: "as a matter of fact I was already aware that a little drilling was going on..."

On Native Reserves, Hofmeyr felt that "early demarcation of Reserves would facilitate and render more effective the proper registration and branding of all stock".

An immediate challenge to Hofmeyr's authority came when a draft treaty to be entered into between King George V and Kaptein Cornelis van Wijk of Rehoboth was published. Hofmeyr said he had no intention of recommending the recognition of such a treaty as the Rehoboth people were not competent to enter into it. A darker side also emerges. "I would advise [the Rehoboth] to consider the expediency of putting the dogs after people who may come there again bent on drafting similar impracticable documents."

Hofmeyr revealed a dry sense of humour. The Rehoboth claimed citizenship rights such as liquor privileges and the right to carry arms (both banned for Natives generally). Hofmeyr agreed with their contentions and agreed to consider "permits for such quantities of liquor as should be allowed to the Christian people they were". He followed up "I pointed out to them that South-West Africa was essentially a place where one should in all walks of life specially guard against the enticing "voice of the siren who eternally slumbers in the yellow bubbles of the whisky decanter". And finally: "If spared, I intend to spend my next birthday with [the Rehoboth] ...".

=== The new legal framework ===
==== The transition from German rule ====
After the German surrender in 1915, South Africa had appointed EHL Gorges as Administrator of the Protectorate. German law remained in force except for such laws as were repealed under martial law. The German Civil Code and the German Criminal Code continued to operate, but the German administrative machinery, which included their courts, ceased to function. No civil courts were established, but military magistrate's courts exercised criminal jurisdiction. This continued up to the creation of the League of Nations Mandate over South West Africa.

Martial law was withdrawn from 1 January 1921 but before this certain steps had been taken. English and Dutch replaced German as the official language. On 1 January 1920 Roman-Dutch law "as existing and applied in the Cape province" was made the "common law" of the territory and German law ceased to exist in so far as it was in conflict with this "common law". Normal civil and criminal courts were constituted.

In terms of Article 297 of the Treaty of Versailles, the Union Government was entitled to retain and liquidate all property rights and interests belonging to German nationals in the territory, but in fact no exceptional war measures were applied to landed estates belonging to German subjects. The provisions of Article 297 were only applied to certain monies of diamond mining companies in the territory.

==== Constitutional Commission ====
In preparation for the withdrawal of martial law, a Commission was appointed by the Union government to advise on a suitable form of civil administration to be introduced. The Commission produced a muddle as it recommended that South West Africa become a fifth province of the Union albeit that the Mandate precluded this.

The Commission dismissed the possibility of independence, crudely opining that "no indigenous civilisation ever existed. The Natives are still in a state of semi-barbarism, and no eventual self-government by the Native races is indicated in the Mandate."

The Commission recommended that "the form of government ... should be ... the form of government at present prevailing in the four Provinces of the Union, giving the population full representation in a Provincial Council and in the Union Parliament. When that stage has been reached, the Protectorate will be administered as a fifth Province of the Union... but subject always to the conditions of the Mandate.

However, the commission recommended that union was only to be implemented once at least 10,000 adult male British subjects of European descent were in the Protectorate. Only those residents as would be British subjects if residing in the Union should have the right to vote. "It is impossible to permit persons who do not owe allegiance to the Union to participate in shaping the political affairs of a territory which is to be administered by the Union as an integral part thereof."

The commissioners were clearly wary of the German settlers wresting political control in South West Africa away from South Africa. Given that the Commission's Report conflicted with the terms of the Mandate, South West Africa did not become a province of the Union. But many of the laws and practices of the Union were implemented in South West Africa by Hofmeyr's administration.

==== Creation of the Advisory Council ====
The sole authority in the territory was the Administrator, who could be overridden by the Union government as the Mandatory Power.

One of Hofmeyr's first acts as Administrator was to convene an Advisory Council of six white settlers to advise him. The members were to be representative of the farming, commercial, mining, wage-earning and Native interests.

No Natives were invited onto the council. Native interests were to be looked after by Major Manning, the "Native Commissioner" (and an employee of the Administration).

Under Proclamation No. 1 of 1921 the duties of the Advisory Council were to advise the Administrator on the raising of revenue, the appropriation of monies for public services, matters of general policy and any other matter requested by the Administrator.

At the first meeting Hofmeyr appealed to the Council, saying that "we are called upon to discourage all petty mindedness and by all means in our power to encourage broad-mindedness".

==== Economic measures ====
Hofmeyr's objective was to establish a new colonial order, including a smooth-running economy of direct benefit to South Africa.

One of the first proclamations of 1921 related to the establishment of a Diamond Board to control the production and marketing of diamonds, as well as the assessment and collection of the diamond tax. The board comprised two representatives of producers and two from the Administration. This reflected the key importance of diamonds to both the economy and to the revenues of the Administration.

Later proclamations from 1921 extended the temporary mining monopoly held by the South-West Africa Company and other companies.

Various forms of taxation were introduced for Natives in both the urban and rural areas of the Police Zone. The white population of the territory paid no income tax or personal tax at this time (although both were payable by whites in the Union at this time).

The administration introduced grazing fees for Native owners of livestock in the Reserves. Such fees were to be paid into trust funds for the Native Reserves, in theory to pay for improvements to infrastructure and agriculture, but in practice the Administration often blocked such expenditure and large credit balances built up.

Hofmeyr then moved swiftly to encourage white settlement and to quash the limited control over land and mobility regained by Natives during the period of martial law.

==== Land policy: white settlement ====
In South West Africa, the European acquisition of land occurred first with the German scramble roughly from 1883 to 1915 and then the South African white settler land rush which followed the German period and had its highest peak in the first half of the 1920s under Hofmeyr.

The German methods of dispossessing the Africans of their lands varied. Initially there were cunning trading deals and the imposition of questionable boundary agreements.

For example, in 1884 Luderitz entered into a deed of purchase with the captain of the impoverished Topnaar people of Walvis Bay, whereby Luderitz acquired the coastal belt from 26 degrees south to Cape Frio at about 18.5 degrees south, except for the Walvis Bay enclave itself. Wellington comments that so far as the rights of the Topnaar captain to this area were concerned it has been justly remarked that he might with equal validity have sold Australia to Luderitz.

The Germans later resorted to force to subjugate the Natives, after which land was confiscated as spoils of war.

By taking Native land in these ways, the German government had provided itself with a large portion of the territory as state-owned land, which in terms of the Treaty of Versailles became Crown lands of South West Africa under the Mandate. Some of this land had been allotted to white farmers during the German period, but much remained in government ownership.

At the beginning of 1920 in the Police Zone the land allocated to or held by Native groups (including the Rehoboth area) comprised only 2,323,111 hectares, whereas there were 1,138 farms in white use, totalling 11,490,000 hectares. The great majority of white landowners derived their title ultimately from the confiscation of land by the German administration after the Herero rebellion. With the repatriation of about half of the German population to Germany, the new Administration had plenty of land to allocate.

Rather than returning the land to Native groups, Hofmeyr responded with a mass land settlement programme for poor white South African settlers. This not only bolstered the number of non-German whites in South West Africa, but also helped South Africa's government - South West Africa had opened up the prospect of jobs and land for growing numbers of impoverished whites in South Africa itself, where landlessness, disaffection and the threat of social unrest were rising.

In 1920 Hofmeyr made a number of proclamations to clear the way for a policy of white land settlement, including Proclamation No 14 of 1920 which applied the Union Land Settlement Act of 1912 to South West Africa and directly facilitated the grant of Crown land to white immigrants with modest means. Hofmeyr set up a Land Board to allocate farms to new white settlers, and the land rush began. The Board was besieged by applicants.

No applications were received, or expected to be received, from the Natives, who looked on with dismay at the disposal of land which they thought would be restored to them after the defeat of the Germans.

For the first 76 farms advertised, there were between 800 and 900 applicants. By the end of 1920, 169 holdings had been allocated to 203 white settlers, and by the end of 1921 in total 414 holdings had been allotted to white settlers. The area of land allotted to white settlers in 1921 alone was 2,125,154 hectares (almost the same amount of land allotted to all Native groups in the Police Zone).

The new immigrants came in rapidly. By 1921 the white population was double its pre-war strength – in spite of the repatriation of 6,000 Germans. The unfairness of the allocation of land is patent. In his Administrator's Report for 1921 Hofmeyr states that the number of farms gazetted as available for disposal under the Land Settlement Proclamation if 1920 during 1921 was 397, involving an additional 3,325,313 hectares to be allocated as farms for white settlers. In addition, Hofmeyr reported that "approximately a further 250 farms have been inspected by the Land Board, but owing to existing water difficulties the disposal thereof is being withheld until water has been opened up." By contrast, in respect of Native Reserves, for a Native population estimated at around 203,000, Hofmeyr proposed a miserly total of 2,500,000 hectares. This was the equivalent of 167 farms held by whites; the average white farm was 15,000 hectares.

By the end of 1922 Hofmeyr's Administration had allotted 583 holdings to 730 white settlers amounting to almost 5 million hectares (almost twice the amount of land proposed by Hofmeyr for Native Reserves).

Considerable incentives and financial assistance were made available for new white settlers. In Hofmeyr's Administrator's Report for 1922 he states that white settlers were provided with financial grants, that 72 boreholes for white settlers were attempted and funded by the Administration, and that 79 windmills were erected for white settlers by the Administration.

Ruth First states that Hofmeyr's Administration "could not do enough for the new farmers. It gave them generous loan terms, granted them remissions on rent arrears, built dams, bored for water and advanced capital for stock. Vast loan amounts were never recovered and were cheerfully discounted. Land-hungry white South Africans, spilling across the border, were allocated huge farms that were then petted and pampered into eventual solvency. Expense seemed no consideration. Even during the years of gloomy Land Bank reports on drought and the shrinking markets for cattle, the white settler schemes continued."

By the end of 1925, 880 holdings had been allotted to 1,106 white settlers. Ruth First comments that "in six energetic years of land settlement, the "sacred trust" had been secured as a white man's country".

These farms were wholly dependent on Native labour, and by 1928 around 60% of Africans in the Police Zone were resident on white settler farms.

After analysing the land set aside for Reserves and the land granted to white settlers, Emmett comments that the fact that Hofmeyr allocated around 28 times more land per person to white settlers during the first five years of the Mandate than was allowed for all Natives in the Police Zone in the same period provides a rough but clear indication of Hofmeyr's priorities.

Confirmation of this is in Hofmeyr's own 1922 Administrator's Report. Hofmeyr refers to "vague charges ... that the Administration does little or nothing to assist the territory in it financial struggle...."" and responds: "What is the truth? We have ... provided capital to the Land Bank of £4,000, ... advanced to settlers £85,000, ... repealed the export tax on slaughter stock... reduced railway rates, ...granted special facilities for the export of mealies ... and ... modified the Land Settlement Laws in favour of settlers".

==== Land Policy: Native Reserves ====
The Germans had created a few Native Reserves in South West Africa – the Witboois Reserve (1898), the Hoachanas Reserve for the Namas (1903) and the small Otjimbingwe Reserve for the Herero (1903). At the end of the German regime these Reserves occupied an area of just over a million hectares, and in addition the Rehoboth Reserve comprised around 1,300,000 hectares. The northern area beyond the Police Zone remained in the possession of the Ovambo, Okavango, Kaokoveld and Caprivi tribes.

Within the Police Zone a degree of segregation had developed under the Germans. Those Natives who had no Reserves had no choice but to accept service on the white farms or be punished for vagrancy.

During the early Mandate period segregation was taken a stage further. The creation of further Reserves was explicitly intended to engineer a thoroughgoing racial segregation; these measures stemmed directly from the segregationist policies being energetically implemented in South Africa at this time.

The Reserves were intended to act as pools of labour and to control African mobility and to have small areas where non-working Native inhabitants could be confined. In addition, they were to be a means of "containing, counting and controlling the black pastoral economy" whose resilience led the authorities and settlers to fear competition with white farmers.

Ruth First comments that "the Herero, still a shattered people, the Nama, calamitously reduced in resources and number, and the Rehobothers, smarting under their recent war losses, actually believed the British politicians and South African generals who had said that the war against the Germans in 1915 was aimed at restoring liberty and justice. The British denunciations of the German colonial system rang true; the Herero, Nama and Rehobothers saw victory as a release. The German occupiers had stolen their lands, and they thought it only just that their release from German rule should mean the restoration of their lands and of their independence." It was not to be.

===== Native Reserves Commission =====
In 1920 Hofmeyr appointed a Natives Reserves Commission to investigate and make recommendations for Native Reserves "without clashing with white interest".

The Native Administration Proclamation Act of 1922 provided for the establishment of segregated areas, called "Native Reserves", for the Native population. Under the Native Reserve regulations promulgated under the Proclamation, the superintendent of a Native Reserve was entitled to order any male resident of a Reserve who had no visible means of support or who lead an idle existence to take up employment in essential public works.

The Native Reserves Commission made recommendations and most of the new Reserves were created between 1923 and 1925. The additional Reserves were almost always in the less desirable areas, where the land was poor and considered to be unfit for white settlement. The Reserves were unable to sustain all the people required to live there. The grazing in the new Reserves lacked phosphate constituents and cattle sickness was rife.

Underground water supplies were very deep or unfavourably situated. For example, in Epukiro Reserve, a well had to be driven 800 feet before water was found; by contrast the average depth for all wells drilled in South West Africa in 1925 was 241 feet. Well drilling in areas allocated to the tribes often achieved nothing at all. Of 13 wells completed in the Reserves in 1925, only 6 yielded usable water.

The Reserves were by design never able to sustain their populations and large numbers of Natives were compelled to go out and seek employment on white farms as well as on the mines, railways and developing industries. By confining Natives to these areas the Administration and white settlers avoided having to pay wages that would support Native workers and their families, and avoided the costs of providing proper housing, sanitation, health care and social care.

Historian Zedekia Nagvirue sums up the policy as follows: "The claims of the whites to the best land is one explanation. The other was the implementation of the traditional South African policy used to produce cheap labour whereby Africans were herded into areas far too small to support them, so that the pressure of land hunger, poverty and starvation forces them to leave their homes in the countryside to seek work on the mines and farms".

Ruth First writes that "If you knew nothing about the siting of the African Reserves, one could plot them on the map by tracing the least fertile areas. The only anomalies were the Rehoboth lands in the middle of the territory and the little Nama Reserves, recognised by German treaty, then expanded".

According to Ruth First "the tribes looked on in stupefaction. They had heard the promises of Lord Buxton, Governor General of the Union, who after the military occupation of 1915 had promised the Herero their "old freedom" along with great possessions of land and cattle. Some unoccupied lands were allocated to the Herero by the military administration, but the Administration that succeeded it under Hofmeyr regarded these as "black islands" of a temporary nature". Natives who had thought themselves settled were required suddenly to move.

Ruth First notes the "cynical self-congratulation" in Hofmey's Administrator's Report of 1921: "During the war period nothing concerning permanent allocation of ground could be done, though even the comparatively few government farms, which in the emergency were granted by our Administration as temporary Reserves, were much appreciated by the Natives entitled to such accommodation, and healthy, well-nourished children born during that period are now to be observed there, representing potential labourers for the future."

In 1922, after very speedy work, Hofmeyr reported that areas for Native Reserves "have been selected with every care and consideration, so as to obviate, as far as human agency can prevent, the occupants from being disturbed even in times of most severe drought." Ruth First comments that "the land was "selected with every care and consideration", perhaps, but only so as to obviate any conflict with the expansion of white settlement".

The Native Reserves Commission recommended that Reserves of just under 9% of the land in the Police Zone (5 million hectares out of 57 million in all) be allocated for Native peoples to live on despite at the time Native people forming 90% of the population of those areas.

But the actual proclamation of Reserves by Hofmeyr was only half of that recommended by the Commission: he returned to the Natives only 2,500,000 hectares (so around 4.4% of the land available) (including the 1,000,000 hectares already occupied by the Bondelswarts, the Bersebas and the Damaras). This was approximately the same amount of land awarded to 414 white settlers in 1921.

===== Native resistance to Reserves =====
For the first half of the 1920s the Administration proceeded to ride roughshod over Native resistance to forced removal.

There were still instances in which the state could be induced to make concessions, as when the Witboois managed to resist being removed to the Tses Reserve in 1923. But these occasions were few.

The Herero were not so fortunate. In the early 1920s the Herero were driven "from fertile valleys to the sandy regions"; they wandered – or were driven – over the years from places first granted to them, and then coveted by whites.

In 1924, Chief Hosea Kutako of the Herero was asked to visit the land initially suggested for the Herero, and when he returned to Windhoek he "told Mr Smit, the Secretary for South West Africa, that the country is a good country ... and that we should like to go there and live there as a nation undivided. There were no people there. It was a wild country. We were then told that the government would inform the magistrate at Gobabis that from Ovitore up to Epukiro will become the Herero land". Chief Kutako went on: "One other official, on hearing this, told the Secretary for South West Africa that that country is the best in South West Africa and should not be given to any Natives. Then the Secretary told us that the official had said that that part of the country is good and is wanted by the white people. We were then told to go and explore north-east of Gobabis towards Epukiro."

Chief Kutako and the other Herero leaders set out to look at the newly proposed land. "Epukiro itself was a Roman Catholic mission and we thought we were meant to go there. But when we arrived at Epukiro, we found there a man who had been ... sent by the government. He said – "no, you are not to stay here but to go farther east. That is your country...". But on their passes, though, was written Epukiro, so they ... said "there is no Epukiro farther to the east. Where are you now sending us?". They said "go to the east. That is what is meant is the district of Epukiro". From Epukiro we travelled east for about 30 miles. On our arrival we found a borehole dug by the government in the desert country."

Chief Kutako's patience is remarkable. "The following morning ... [we] went out to see the place and travelled over the whole country which is now the Reserve. We came back at night... the following morning they pumped out water from the borehole. We were then told this is only the first borehole. Others will be dug and this will become your country. ... I then told Mr Cope: "we are a big nation and as such we shall not develop in country like this where there is only deep borehole water. In fact it is a desert where no human being ever lived before... it is not healthy for the people or the cattle. Only one farm can depend upon borehole water. It is no use for a whole nation".

Chief Kutako's logic was impeccable. "We told Mr Cope that we are the original inhabitants of South West Africa and we know the best and worst of the whole country. We know the parts which are good for cattle. We know the parts which are good for wild beasts. We are human beings and we do not want to be changed into wild beasts. Only wild beasts can live without water. We spent a lot of money on boreholes at Okamuraere and the place we went before..."

In April 1924 Chief Kutako met Hofmeyr who noted that Chief Kutako had "become very unpopular by advising the Natives to go to Epukiro". Hofmeyr "warned him to continue to do the right thing and to use his influence to get the people to go". The threat implicit in Hofmeyr's reply emphasized that Chief Kutako had very little choice.

Once confined to the Reserves, the Herero did not have the money to travel to the urban centres to purchase goods at fair prices. Conditions in the Reserves were inadequate for stock raising and stock had to walk long distances after purchase by travelling buyers, so the Herero did not receive good prices for their animals.

In 1925, Hofmeyr used force to remove the Herero from Orumbo and drive them into the two main Herero Reserves of Aminuis and Epukiro. Administration forces burned down Herero houses and destroyed windmills. Demonstration bombings by the South African Air Force left people in little doubt as to what would happen to them should they choose not to move. Chief Kutako and some other men were taken to prison at Gobabis where they were kept for two days.

Later, Chief Kutako petitioned Hofmeyr. "I have been sent by the Hereros at Aminuis... Aminuis has water surplus but no grazing owing to their being too many cattle round the water holes. The pasture also is not good and has no fattening qualities."

The Herero were now confined to Reserves which were in effect death traps for cattle. If the cattle strayed beyond the confines of the Reserve they were liable to be impounded. Hofmeyr took no action after receiving Chief Kutako's petition.

===== Assessment =====
Ruth First was damning about Hofmeyr's allocation of Reserves. "The tribes had asked for the restoration of their old tribal lands at a time when just over ten million hectares of the country had been in white use out of eighty-two and a half million hectares, so around 12%".

"The Administration had never displayed the slightest intention of conceding any Native claim to their land. It had initiated instead white settlement with feverish speed, contrived the submission of the tribes with one makeshift after the other, and meanwhile manipulated the alienation of their land. It was not a shortage of land that restricted African occupation, but a matter of policy, the traditional South African policy of rigid race rule. Throughout the history of its control over South West Africa, the Administration has always found enough land – and the best land – for white farmers, and never enough for the African tribes. Only the code of white supremacy can account for the double entries in the books of the Administration".

Hofmeyr's justifications for the Reserve policy were weak. In his 1921 Report he stated that the "Native question is the land question insofar as settled conditions, contentment, and even continuance of the population are concerned". But "at this late stage" Hofmeyr said "there are difficulties in the way of procuring sufficient or suitable ground on account of the vested rights having to be considered".

Hofmeyr's report continued: "in this territory owing to water difficulties and the fact that grazing becomes trampled out – especially within the neighbourhood of wells and boreholes – Europeans naturally object to Natives with stock settling on their farms, large as the latter are, and the necessity for Reserves is perhaps greater than in the Union, where Natives' families on farms can, as a rule, produce food for themselves by planting crops".

Wellington asks "what does "at this late stage" mean? This is the first year of the Mandate and already, we are told "vested interests", which can only mean the German farms and the 169 farms allotted to white settlers in 1920, make it difficult to find good land for the Native Reserves."

Emmett points out that in 1924 Hofmeyr stated in his annual report that there were "hundreds of good farms" still awaiting white settlers. Emmett comments that there were "clearly different standards governing the availability of land for Natives and whites in the territory".

In his 1922 Administrator's Report Hofmeyr describes the difficulties in getting the Herero to move from their temporary Reserves to the sandveld Reserves, and the impossibility of returning original lands to the Natives. Hofmeyr's report acknowledged the historical injustice and the expectations of Natives that land would be returned. "The Natives who of course had been the original owners of the land which had as a result of war been confiscated by the German Government, cut up into farms and sold or allotted to Europeans, had formed the expectation that this Administration, as a natural result of the war would similarly confiscate German owned farms and thus the Natives would recover the lost land and homes previously occupied by them...Almost without exception each section [of Natives] asked for the allotment of the old tribal areas in which vested rights had accrued and the utmost difficulty was experienced in making them realise the utter impossibility of complying with such a request".

In Wellington's view, Hofmeyr's statement that he experienced "the utmost difficulty" in making the Natives realise the "utter impossibility of complying with such a request" seems surely to point not to the Natives inferior comprehension but to the whites' calculated duplicity, pointing out that under the Mandate South Africa had been given, and accepted, the political conditions enabling it to give high priority to Native interests in South West Africa.

Wellington suggests that "vested rights" and the "utter impossibility" of allotting to the Herero even a portion of their former lands "sounds an alarm". "What has happened since 1918 when the South African Government published the Blue Book, its indictment of Germany with regard to her treatment of the Native people of South West Africa? The indictment alleged that Germany had goaded the Herero into rebellion and had thereby attempted to exterminate them and take possession of their lands."

At Versailles these and other accusations had led to the decision that Germany's colonies should not be returned to her but that they should be administered by Mandatories who would safeguard the interest of "the inhabitants where were not yet able to stand by themselves". The Treaty of Versailles had made provision for the repatriation of the German colonists who would be compensated by Germany so that the Mandatories should have no obstacle in the way of looking after the interests of the Native people.

But here in this situation Hofmeyr as Administrator establishes the German colonists on the land which on South Africa's own showing the Germans wrongfully wrested from the Natives and informs these same Natives that because of these "vested rights" they can get no part of their former lands back but must be content which what is probably the worst land in the territory outside of the Namib desert.

Wellington's verdict was damning of Hofmeyr. "The policy of segregation is invoked but where it is used as a reason for bolstering the claims of the strong to the best land, and forcing the weak to accept the worst, then surely it should not be called the principle of segregation but plain greed and grab which the whole League Covenant was created to destroy".

For Wellington, Hofmeyr's first acts reveal him using the screen of "vested interests" to conceal his decision to put white interests first and foremost and to "fob off on to the Natives the poor land that the whites scorn to occupy". "In this act were sown the seeds of the Herero distrust of the white South Africans, and the seeds too of the world's distrust of South Africa as a guardian and protector of Native people.

When Hofmeyr appeared before the Mandates Commission in Geneva in 1924, he was asked whether under the system of segregation in the Reserves, the Native would advance rapidly enough. Hofmeyr replied that the Reserves "were not places where the Native could pass his time in idleness, and so deteriorate. And he worked as well on the mines, railways and government undertakings, so that he was constantly in contact with the whites. There was therefore every hope of gradually civilising him..."

In 1925, when the water shortage in the new African Reserves was critical, the Mandates Commission asked whether the Administration could not meet the cost of more boreholes. Hofmeyr was not present, but the South African representative replied that "it would be wrong to spend part of the country's general revenue on improving the private property of a particular tribe".

By 1926 the major resettlements were almost complete. The Administration successfully complemented the German schemes to establish a well-entrenched racial oligarchy.

The white settlers complained of a shortage of labour, and Hofmeyr's administration introduced a number of laws to reduce the Africans to a state of permanent servitude. Within a few years African families were confronted with a choice: either stay in the Reserves and live below subsistence level or send younger members into white areas (often the former tribal lands they had lost) to work as herd "boys" or as unskilled industrial labourers to enable their families to reach subsistence level. The San people, whose endurance against physical odds is beyond average, chose the former. Other groups, the latter.

==== Laws introduced to produce and control Native labour ====
Ruth First notes that migrant labour was the cornerstone of policy once South Africa took possession of the Mandate. Migrant labour was encouraged by the crowding of Africans into small Reserves to undermine their subsistence economy, and by the increase of taxes to increase their impoverishment.

Labour regulations decreed that an African may enter a labour area and earn a cash wage, to pay his tax and tide his family over in their rural slum, but that he must return home at the end of his labour contract.

The Administration created three distinct groups of workers: (a) those few qualified to live and work in town or on white farms, (b) male migrant workers from the Reserves in the centre and south of the country, many of whom worked on white farms on a temporary basis and (c) male contract workers from the north, mostly working on the mines, railways and fisheries in Walvis Bay. These differentiations also coincided with ethnic ones – a feature of the Administration's wider approach of divide and rule.

That the Natives should be reluctant to provide labour for the white farmers is scarcely surprising. Pastoral groups like the Herero were aware of the different labour requirements of indigenous and commercial farming strategies and held the latter in some contempt. According to the ethnologist Heinrich Vedder, writing in 1928: "labour, in the European sense, is unknown to the Herero. According to him the white man makes unnecessary work whereby he only worries himself and others."

Administration officials had strong prejudices about Native labour. Major Herbst, the Secretary for South West Africa and an expert on Native affairs in his evidence to the South African Commission of Enquiry into the Bondelswarts Rebellion in 1922, stated that "there is not a lazier Native on the face of the earth than the Hottentot. When the sun comes up then he is finished for the day".

Proclamation 3 of 1917 regulated the employment and treatment of Natives on the mines and other large works. All other key Native labour laws were introduced by Hofmeyr's Administration.

In his 1921 Report Hofmeyr stated that he had been inundated with complaints that a good deal of potential labour in the country was not made available to the white settlers, and at the same time the Natives were complaining of ill treatment and insufficient wages. Hofmeyr moved quickly to ensure white settlers had sufficient labour.

===== 1920 Vagrancy Proclamation =====
In 1920 the Vagrancy Proclamation was issued, making it a criminal offence for a person to be "wandering abroad as an idle or vagrant person" which included "a person having no or insufficient visible means of support or found without permission of the owner wandering over any farm, or loitering near any dwelling-place or other enclosed space". Any such person was liable to imprisonment or a fine.

A magistrate was required to adjudge a first offender to a term of service on public works or private employment with a designated private person (other than the complainant) at a wage the magistrate might deem fair.

The purpose of the law to convert recently dispossessed people into labourers for the white settlers could not be clearer. This discretionary power developed into a fruitful source of farm labour. Indeed, the result of this provision was that farmers, needing labour, often waited outside the court to engage offenders of this category. The arrest of vagrants thus became in fact a useful means of supplying farmers with labourers.

===== 1920 Master and Servant Proclamation =====
The Masters and Servants Proclamation of 1920 provided for criminal punishment for a servant who by wilful breach or neglect of duty or drunkenness caused his master immediate loss, or if as a herdsman he failed to report the death or loss of stock, or if he deserted.

Other penalties were imposed for less serious offences such as being late or absent from work, being intoxicated, refusing to obey a lawful command, impertinence and the like. Under the Proclamation the withholding of wages and unlawful dismissal were also penalised.

===== 1921 Dog Tax =====
One way in which Blacks could subsist and so avoid working for white settlers was to hunt game with small packs of dogs. Dogs were also essential for the protection of stock from jackals.

Under the German regime, the Germans had shot the hunting dogs when the Black's success in hunting had led to a reduction in the number of labourers offering services to settlers, and the Germans had later introduced a Dog Tax. In 1917, the South African military Administration had also imposed a Dog Tax to achieve the same ends, with the rate of tax escalating rapidly for additional dogs owned.

In 1920 Hofmeyr toured the territory and found that Blacks and a "certain class of European squatters" were still making extensive use of dogs to hunt game, instead of earning a living by what Hofmeyr called "honest labour". Farmers, particularly those in the south, put pressure on Hofmeyr to increase the Dog Tax so that Blacks would be forced to seek work with them.

Hofmeyr increased the Dog Tax substantially in February 1921, turning it into an enormously punitive tax, which according to historian Emmett, was "absurdly high". Historian Susan Pedersen points out that the new tax amounted to between one and two months wages for one dog, rising to the laughable amount of ten pounds, or as much as one or two years' wages, for five dogs.

The levying of this and other taxes contributed to pressures on Blacks to enter the labour market; money now had to be earned to meet taxation demands. However, white farmers were often unable to pay the wages, making it even harder for people to pay the new Dog Tax.

In Hofmeyr's 1921 Report he states: "The [Dog Tax] has already fulfilled its immediate object in the prevention of the pernicious evil perpetrated by certain Whites and Blacks in keeping large numbers of dogs to forage for them, ruthlessly destroying quantities of game, and affording these vagrants and loafers an easy means of livelihood, which relieves them of any need to work".

Hofmeyr later denied that the tax had been imposed to force Blacks to seek work, claiming that its purpose was to protect game, although the evidence suggests otherwise.

The Dog Tax was one of the principal causes of the Bondelswarts Rebellion and thus brought the Administration on to a collision course with the very wards whom it was obliged to care for in the exercise of a "sacred trust".

For historian Katjavivi, the new vagrancy and other laws including the increased Dog Tax evidenced a clear policy of forced labour that directly contravened the terms of the Mandate.

===== 1922 Pass Laws and curfews for Blacks =====
In German times all Blacks over the age of seven had to carry passes. This practice had ceased during the period of martial law.

In 1922 Hofmeyr re-introduced pass laws regulating the movement of Natives over the age of fourteen by way of Proclamation 11 of 1922. "A Native found beyond the confines of a location, reserve, farm or place of residence or employment shall exhibit on demand by the police... his pass and on neglect to produce it may be arrested". This implemented the South African style "pass law" system. Only Blacks living outside the Police Zone and in the Rehoboth area were exempt from the new pass law system.

In addition, non-Europeans could not enter or leave the territory nor travel within the territory without a permit. Proclamation 33 of 1922 authorised the imposition of a curfew for Natives. Local authorities were permitted to make regulations for prohibiting and preventing the presence of a Native in the streets or public places of any town, except the locations, between the hours of 9pm and 4am without a pass from his employer or a proper officer.

===== Labour recruitment agencies =====
Ruth First recounts how in 1924 a sharp shock reverberated through the session of the Mandates Commission at Geneva when it was noted that Hofmeyr's 1923 Report recorded that religious missions operating in Ovamboland were required to furnish a written undertaking to assist and support the policy of the Administration and to "encourage all Natives under their influence to seek employment in the Police Zone".

Hofmeyr, confronted with this, explained that the government had never contemplated turning the missions into labour agencies: it had intended only that they should "inculcate into Natives the principle of the dignity of labour". Once brought to light, this arrangement could not survive scrutiny. It was officially killed shortly thereafter.

Two contract recruiting agencies were created in 1925: the Southern Recruiting Organisation which recruited for the diamond mines and farms, and the Northern Labour Organisation which recruited for the Tsumeb copper mine, industry and farms.

Men being recruited were given a rudimentary medical check and then allocated for work underground in the mines, for surface work on the mines or heavy farm labour, or for lighter farm work as stock herders. No choice was given to the recruits in relation to such categorisations. No hours or conditions of work were specified – only that "the servant is required to render the master his service at all fair and reasonable times".

===== "Ugly laws" =====
The weight of all these laws on the Blacks was considerable.

The South African rulers were milder or laxer in small things than the Germans had been, but they maintained intact two basic rules of the German system: every male Black must carry a pass; and he must be in the service of a white master unless he possessed visible means of support.

The German law forbidding Blacks to own private land was carried over into the South African administration.

The German practice of flogging was curbed and the Blacks were permitted the possession of small herds of cattle, but the Administration failed to break with the spirit of the German labour policies.

In relation to the Natives, Hofmeyr's Administration's education policy, its administration of justice, its health policy, its land policy, its attitudes towards missions, its attitude towards the prohibition of arms and liquor and towards Native affairs in general, all revolved around the basic assumption that the Black's existence had only one important purpose – to serve white interests.

Despite Hofmeyr's lofty initial intentions (as set out in his Memorandum of 4 January 1921), Hofmeyr had not been able to administer the territory without introducing many of the "ugly laws" he had been hoping to avoid.

However, some laws were expressly well-intentioned. Hofmeyr made time to pass Proclamation 10 of 1921, providing for the protection of fine specimens of San people paintings and other relics, Proclamation 13 of 1921, for the protection of game (but there was no protection for lions or leopards), and Proclamation 28, providing for the protection of girls and mentally defective women.

In Ovamboland, the power of the Administration remained very limited, although the Administration was undermining the area's independence through closing the border with Angola, policing internal boundaries, and excluding the area from South West Africa's markets. Nonetheless, in the 1920s, the experience of colonialism remained shallow in Ovamboland.

==== The "Native Question" ====
In his 1921 Report Hofmeyr stated that the "Native question is synonymous with the labour question", and then detailed the measures taken in relation to the labour question. However, Hofmeyr raised the excuse that "pressure of work" made it impossible for him to give personal attention to the "Native Question".

Wellington remarks that "as one reads these statements ... one cannot help wondering what has happened to the "sacred trust of civilisation" upon which the Mandate was based, that Hofmeyr could not find time to "get about and study the question for myself". Was the "Native Question" of such minor importance that it could be crowded out by "pressure of work"?

In Katjavivi's view the Administration actively set about moulding the Blacks into servants of white society but failed to promote the "material and moral well-being" and "social progress" of the people of South West Africa, as required by the League of Nations Mandate for German South West Africa.

The Mandates Commission censured Hofmeyr's Administration for its perspective that the Blacks were there chiefly as a labour force for the whites.

It seems that to Hofmeyr the Native question was never the "Native question". The Black was never regarded as an end in himself, he was never seen to possess worthiness as an individual human.

Consequently Blacks were never treated as the object of the "sacred trust". Blacks were treated primarily as objects to be used as needed for the economic development of the European community. Blacks were primarily "labour units", devoid of personality and rights.

Few actions concerning Native affairs were undertaken strictly for the purpose or value of uplifting the Blacks, who apparently in the eyes of Hofmeyr and the Administration, had little value apart from their utility as labourers.

==== Education ====
Hofmeyr's education policies were heavily focussed on white children and resulted in overt neglect of Black children. In his 1921 Report, Hofmeyr stated that there are 27 government schools (all for whites), plus 13 German schools.

There were only a few schools established for Blacks. The teaching was in German and very elementary, focusing on German language and culture and bible studies. Hofmeyr's 1921 Report stated that "Native education is in the hands of the Catholic Mission, the Evangelical Mission, and the Finnish Mission. The teachers are to some extent trained, but no training of teachers has been undertaken since the beginning of the war. Some support is provided by government grants".

In 1921 school attendance was low. For seven to sixteen year-olds only 21% of White children attended school and 15% of African children. The Administration made efforts to rationalise the various white schools and to consolidate control over them. In its first educational ordinance, it placed all the territory's education under the Administration's authority. For the white population it established state schools in the Police Zone.

Hofmeyr did little to improve Black education. In his 1922 Administrator's Report, Hofmeyr stated that "since the arrival of the missionaries, from the earliest times, the teaching of the Native children has been entirely in the hands of the missionaries who were subsidised by the late government. Owing to the ravages of the many wars, very meagre results have been achieved... There are no trained Native teachers available. It is not possible on account of the language difficulty to make use of trained teachers from the union.

In his 1925 Report Hofmeyr admitted that the amounts budgeted for Native education were small but asserts that they "meet present day requirements". The Herero, he pointed out, "do not believe in education for their children". The Rehobothers "still regard themselves as an independent people and refuse to accept support for their schools".

All expensive methods were studiously avoided by the Administration. Hofmeyr laments in the 1925 Report that "to take a Native from his natural surroundings, housing him in expensive double-storied buildings, teaching him the use of saw-mills... is not educating him; it is rather a process of wrenching him from his people, confusing him by things he sees but does not appreciate and understand, and then turning him adrift, a thoroughly bewildered and, as far as the uplifting of his own people is concerned, a useless individual".

This reflected the general white opinion in the territory, and represented an attitude which was at this time prevalent in some other Mandated territories. Wellington accepts as true that there was a reluctance in certain tribes to make the effort to become educated. However, he goes on to say that "the fact that Hofmeyr's Administration accepted this reluctance as a favourable factor in the problem of labour supply for white colonists and did as little as possible to overcome the Native inertia may be judged by the impartial observer as an essential betrayal of the Mandatory principle".

By 1925, there were 45 government schools and 20 mission schools for whites. No government schools had been created for Blacks who were serviced only by the few mission schools.

Hofmeyr used his education policy to try to implement his earlier ideas of unifying the white "races". In the Advisory Council Hofmeyr argued for the amalgamation of German schools with other schools for Europeans. "If I am accused of trying to make good South Africans of all European children in the territory, I plead guilty. I shall continue to labour for that great undivided white South Africa of the future...".

By contrast, in 1926 Hofmeyr enunciated two basic principles for Native education. "1. The aim is to develop the Native on his own lines, in his own language and in keeping with his own habits. 2. The method of achieving this aim is to help him to develop step by step from his present raw Native state. Any desire to show early results by making him skip a number of rungs on the ladder of progress is unsound and is bound to have disastrous results in the end."

Wellington remarks that "the unsympathetic disinterested observer might be tempted to say that these principles would at any rate keep the Native sufficiently backward to preserve his complete serfdom for many generations and ensure the labour so necessary for the increasing white settlement".

The first state school for Blacks was only set up in 1935 in Aminuis Reserve after a series of protests about inadequate education by the Herero community, and even then the standard was very low, offering only five years of basic schooling.

By way of comparison, Tanganyika, which was also a former German colony and from 1920 administered directly by Britain under a League of Nations Mandate, provided ten years of schooling for Natives by the 1930s. Even so, this educational provision in Tanganyika was low by east African standards.

According to Katjavivi, what Africans wanted at this time and throughout the colonial period was literary education in a European language, as this was seen as the route to high wages, equality and power. In South West Africa, policy was against this as "to educate [Blacks] is to give them contact with world movements which of course inculcates such mischievous and intolerable ideas of democracy, the brotherhood of man, fundamental human freedoms and the like".

==== Franchise and representation ====
From the very start the lack of an effective Black voice in the administration of the territory appeared to be accepted by the whites as a matter of course. In his Advisory Council Hofmeyr appointed, as one of his advisors, a councillor who had acquaintance with Native conditions in the territory and this might be, and in fact was, a government official who, unless he was prepared to risk dismissal, could scarcely do more than give a discreet opinion on a contentious matter.

In 1925 a limited form of self-government was granted to all British nationals in the territory. This included all of the Germans who had been "naturalised" in 1923. Ruth First comments that by bringing the German population into representative government Hofmeyr and the South African government showed that they were amenable to enlisting the help of all white men in fortifying race supremacy.

Under the South West Africa Constitution Act of 1925 a legislative assembly was established of which six members were appointed and 18 elected. White settlers dominated the executive committee and advisory council.

Only whites were allowed to vote. No Black representatives were permitted and no Black was able to vote. Hofmeyr did not introduce any franchise laws equivalent to the Cape qualified franchise which enabled a few propertied Blacks in the Cape to vote.

Wellington refers to the domination of the white settlers in the territory's political affairs. Neither magistrates nor, it appears, Hofmeyr himself, were able to stand against their wishes and demands.

By way of example, the new representative government, following the lead of sensitive German representatives, passed a resolution for the destruction of the Blue Book that had so carefully documented German misdeeds up to 1915.

The Blacks, in consequence, were without political representation. On a local level they were dependent for common justice on the white magistrate who generally felt compelled to put the white settlers' interests first.

Wellington notes that if no man can be judge in his own case, the success of entrusting a Mandate to a dominant group, whose interests clash with those of its wards, would appear from the South West African situation to be doomed from the start, and to unavoidably set a course for conflict with the Mandates Commission.

==== Black resistance ====
Direct resistance peaked with the Bondelswarts Rebellion of May 1922 and the Rehoboth Uprising of 1923-25. Hofmeyr's handling of these events is considered in detail in separate sections below.

Black resistance was bolstered by the thinking of the Jamaican political activist Marcus Garvey. Garvey had founded the Universal Negro Improvement Association (UNIA) in 1914. UNIA's slogan was "Africa for the Africans", and its aims included "to establish a universal confraternity among the Black race; to promote the spirit of race pride and love; to administer to and assist the needy... to assist in the development of independent Negro nations and communities...to establish universities, colleges academies and schools; to work for better conditions among Negroes everywhere".

Garveyism had been introduced to South West Africa in the early 1920s when a number of West Africans and West Indians working in Luderitz established a division of UNIA. The fact that Garveyism gained influence has been attributed to the broken promises made by the South Africans when they took over South West Africa.

Fritz Headly, president of the Luderitz branch of UNIA, summed up their thinking in June 1920: "This our fatherland must be freed from the white man's rule, for his reign is simply stifling the talents and progressiveness of our people".

The white community felt threatened by UNIA. Meetings were monitored by the police and attempts were made to discourage involvement.

In December 1921 one of the Luderitz leaders, Fitzherbert Headly, visited Windhoek and met with the Herero leadership. It was claimed that over 500 people had joined the Windhoek branch by January 1922. It was believed by members that contribution money would be used to buy land for members.

In early 1922, rocks on the side of the road leading to Omaruru were painted with indelible tar with the words ""this land belongs to Michael (Jtisiseta). This land is not yours, it is the property of America and the Herero". Accompanying the text was a mural depicting a hand gripping a flaming heart, a symbol of UNIA.

In 1923 a new association was formed among Hereros called Otjiserandu – the "red bank". It came into being at the time of the burial of Chief Samuel Maherero, whose body had been brought back from Botswana to be buried at his family grave at Okahandja in August 1923. A great number of people attended, including some whites, and a representative of the Administration laid a wreath on the grave. The association reasserted the Herero desire for self-determination.

In Windhoek in 1924 there was a widespread tax boycott by location residents.

None of these attempts to resist domination by the Whites succeeded. The first and most tragic was the Bondelswarts affair in 1922.

=== Bondelswarts punitive expedition (May 1922) ===
Before the Germans arrived the Bondelswarts (now the ǃGamiǂnun, a clan of the Nama people) occupied an area of 40,000 square kilometres (4 million hectares) from the Orange River northwards to beyond the Great Karas Mountains and westwards to the Fish River.

In 1889 the Bondelswarts "sold" 60,000 square kilometres of land to the English company Karas Khoma Exploration and Prospecting Syndicate. When Theodor Leutwein, the German colonial administrator, visited the Bondelswarts in 1895, he was surprised at the contents of the agreement, and could only attribute Willem's action to the fact that he was under the influence of alcohol at the time of signing. Leutwein agreed to remedy the inequitable results of the agreement at a later date, and the purchase was not allowed in its full extent by the German administration, which in 1892 granted the Syndicate a concession of 50,000 square km on the condition that the company should build a railway from Luderitz to the interior. This obligation was not fulfilled and the concession was reduced by the German administration to 12,800 sq km of land to be selected by the company. The Syndicate's selection of the best farmland, and the acquisition of the best watering places, was considered later to be one of the deepest causes of the Bondelswarts rebellion.

The Bondelwarts had risen against the Germans in 1898 and again in 1904-1906 and as a result much of their remaining original land had been confiscated, either directly or because they had insufficient funds to pay the expenses of the German expedition which were levied upon them. By 1922 over 95% of their original lands had been lost, and under the 1906 peace treaty with the Germans the Bondelswarts were confined to a Reserve of just 175,000 hectares, a little over 4% of their original holdings.

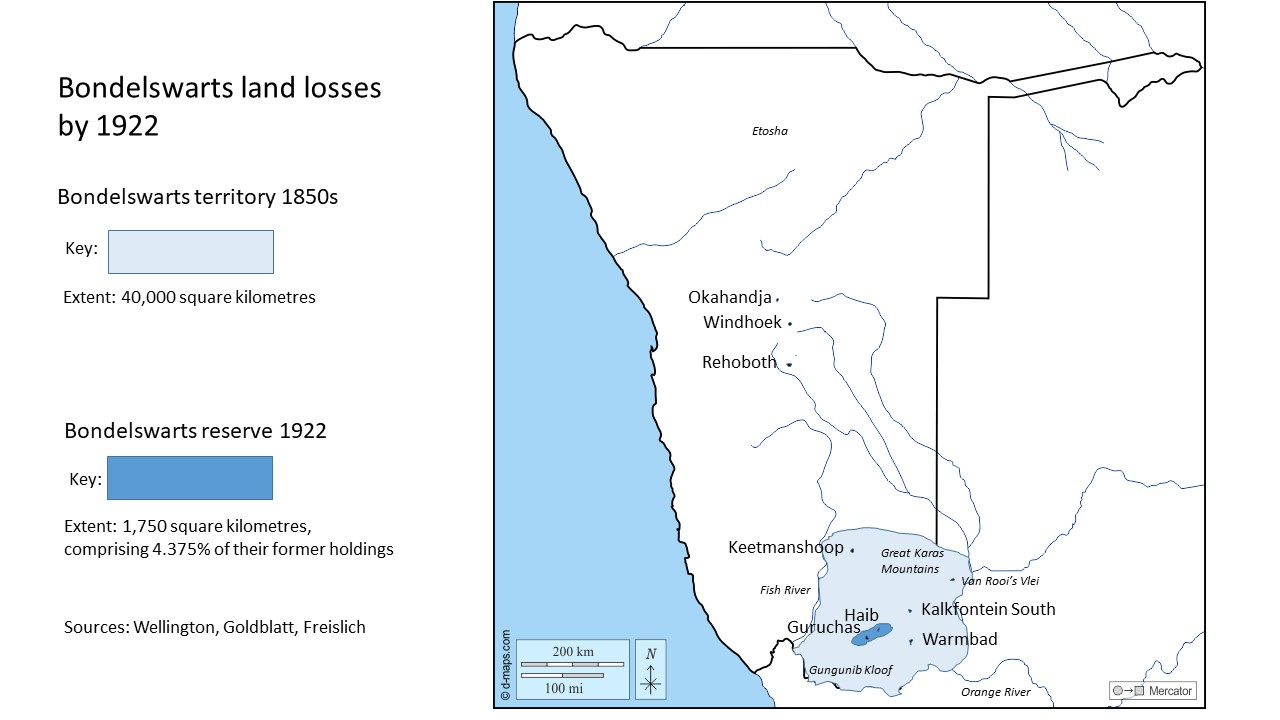
Bondelswarts Land Losses 1850-1922

Hofmeyr found himself under immediate pressure from European settlers who for some years had been scared of Native uprisings.

In February 1921 Hofmeyr visited the Bondelswarts and listened to their complaints. In May the same year he instructed Major Manning, who had been appointed Native Commissioner for South West Africa, to produce a report.

Major Manning was deeply struck by the poverty of the Bondelswarts. He found them "living chiefly on gum (acacia), goats, milk etc.", and reported that they stated that "in former years they had been able ... to live fairly comfortably but owing to the smallness of wages and rations now obtainable...high prices charged by the traders ... and loss of most of their stock as a result of the war, they were in distress."

The Commission of inquiry into the Bondelswarts Rebellion later appointed by the South African government stated: "Here we have a people growing each year poorer and yet poorer and more miserable, men and women who require the supreme grace of patience and forbearance just because their conditions of life made them wayward and unreasonable. For such people what was needed and is always needed is the human quality of understanding".

The Bondelswarts had a bitter sense of grievance against the Dog Tax Hofmeyr had introduced. They needed the dogs for the protection of their small stock and they used them for hunting; but Hofmeyr held the strong conviction that hunting was a bad thing for Natives – they ought rather to work for the settlers.

A money tax was a strong incentive for Natives to look for work, but the Dog Tax had been set so high that they could not earn the money for it in paid employment. As they put it to Major Manning "they had never refused to pay the Dog Tax but had no money. Their stock was usually in quarantine and when any could be sold they only got a few shillings for them. They were only permitted to sell grass to the storekeepers, who only gave small prices and these in the form of "goodfors" for goods".

Manning recommended that dealings with the tribe should be removed from police control and entrusted to the civilian authorities. This recommendation was sound but the ensuing action at administrative headquarters was tardy and ill-considered.

==== Bondelswarts petition ====
On 1 February 1922 the magistrate at Warmbad forwarded an exceptionally politely phrased petition addressed to Hofmeyr from the Bondelswarts in which they raised issues relating to a dispute about the borders of their Reserve, requested a reduction of the punitive Dog Tax, and sought permission to brand their stock themselves (the Administration had passed a law that while white settlers could brand their own stock Natives had to have their stock branded by the White authorities).

The petition was addressed by thirty Bondelswarts leaders to Hofmeyr. "Wij ... geven met de meest verschuldigde eerbied to keenen: dat wij uwe Excellentie van harte dankzeggen dat U ons een Kommissaris gegeven heert, tot wie wij kunnen gaan om al onze belangen to vertegenwooridgen." (We ... address you with the most due reverence: we thank Your Excellency wholeheartedly that You have given us a Commissioner, to whom we can go to represent all our interests).

In relation to the Dog Tax the petition stated "dat wij eerbiediglik bidden om tog indien mogentlik de hondenbelasting te verminderen dare de bestaande belasting voor ons zeer hoog is en moeijelik om te betalen" (that we reverently pray if it is possible that we may reduce the Dog Tax as the existing tax for us is very high and difficult to pay).

The petition generously asks that the right to live in the Bondelswarts Reserve be not limited to Bondelswarts only: "dat wij Uwe Excellentie eerbiedeiglik verzoeken om toetelaten, date de kleurlingen van andere stamen en di Bastaards die in onze Reserve wonen, en ingegurgered zijn, tog niet uit onze Reserve abte verwijderen" (that we respectfully request Your Excellency to admit that the Coloureds of other tribes and the Bastards who live in our Reserve, and who are established, should not be removed from our Reserve). Even although the Bondelswarts had insufficient land for themselves they still asked permission to share their land with Coloureds and others.

The Bondelswarts leaders closed the petition "met de meeste hoogachting" (with the highest regards).

The Warmbad magistrate in his cover letter reported to Hofmeyr that the Land Surveyor General had settled the boundary dispute, although he acknowledged that the Bondelswarts were not happy with the result.

In relation to the Dog Tax, the magistrate commented that "there are certainly several members of the tribe who are in very poor circumstances... and insist on keeping as many as four dogs".

The magistrate noted that in the last year the Dog Tax was paid out of the proceeds of the sale of lime from the Reserve but that no further lime is required and so there will be no funds for payment.

In addition, the magistrate noted that the price of stock had greatly decreased. The magistrate stated "I have no doubt that the Natives in the Reserve are keeping far too many mongrels, notwithstanding that vermin such as jackals and wild cats abound in the Reserve".

No mention is made of the generous request, made in a time of extreme hardship, for the non-tribe members to be allowed to remain in the over-crowded Reserve.

Hofmeyr visited the Bondelswarts at Driehoek on 26 February 1922. The Bondelswarts prepared lavish hand-drawn welcoming papers, bound with pink ribbon. These welcoming papers were kept by Hofmeyr in his personal papers.

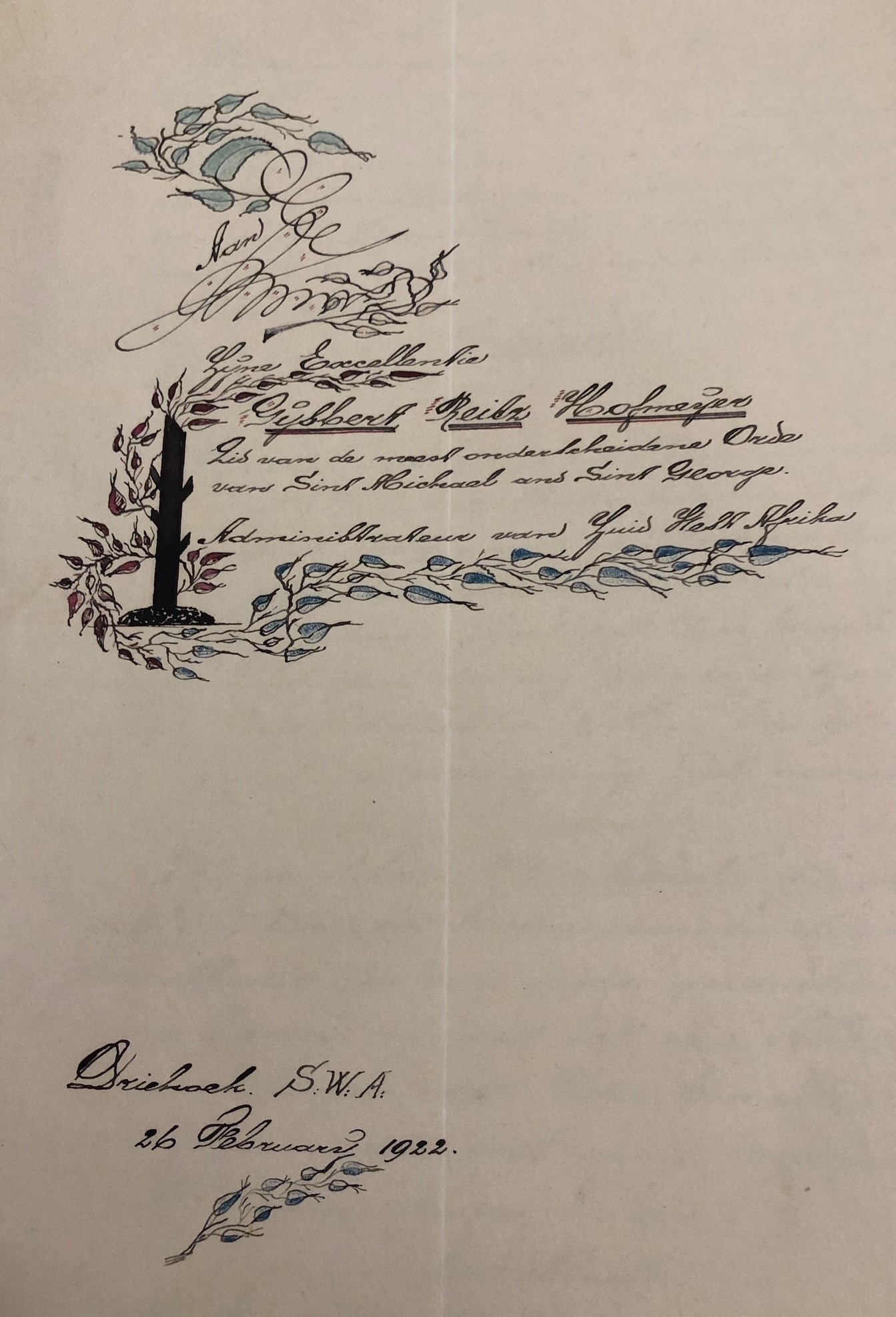
1922 Bondelswarts welcome to GR Hofmeyr Driehoek 26 February 1922

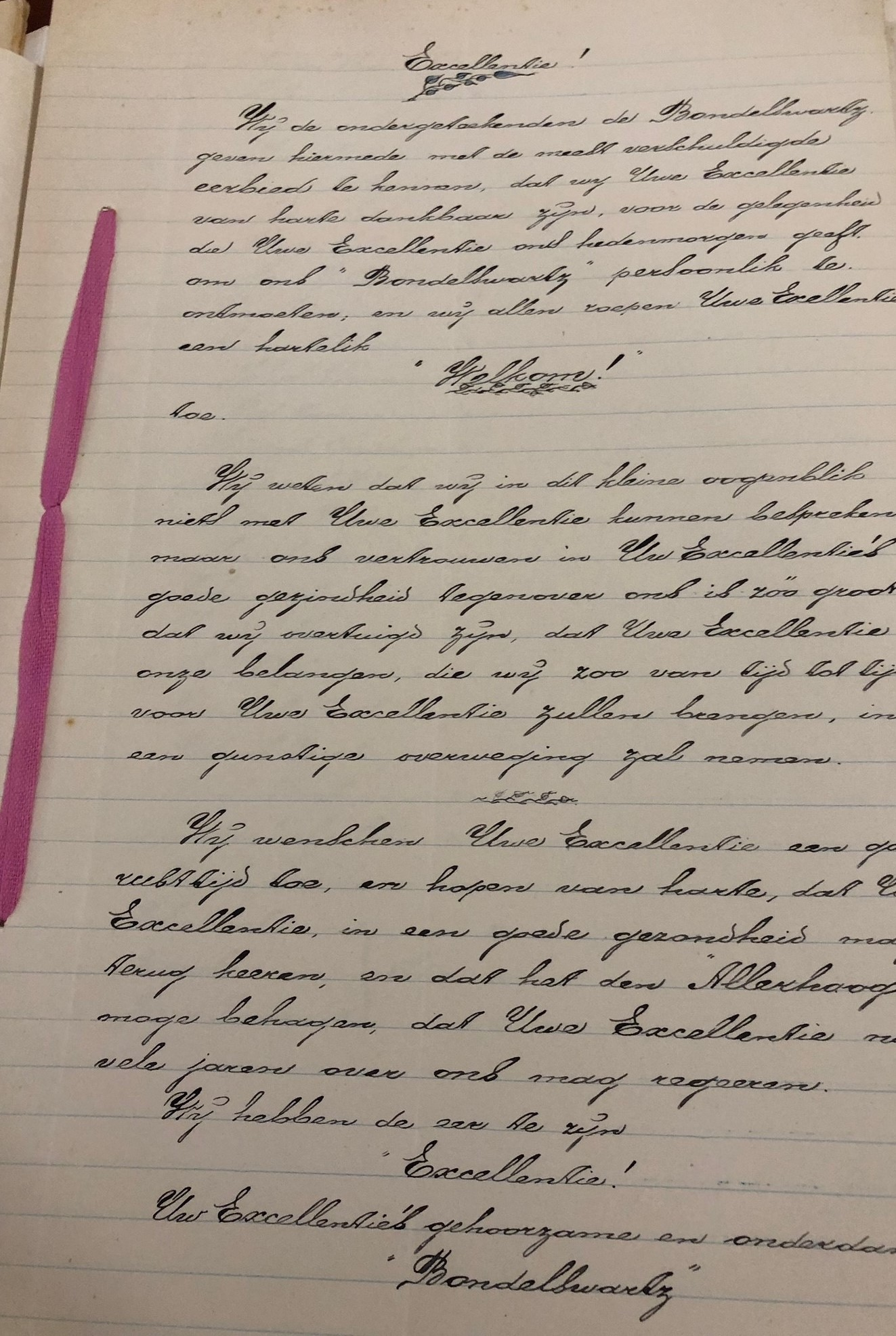
1922 Bondelswarts welcome to GR Hofmeyr Driehoek 26 January 1922(2)

With this background, the Bondelswarts punitive expedition could take place just a few months later.

==== Negotiations ====
The matters raised in the petition were not satisfactorily settled, and the mishandling of another issue escalated the dispute into armed conflict.

The Bondelswarts had accepted back into the Reserve Abraham Morris (one of the heroes of the 1903-1906 Bondelswarts uprising against the Germans) and others. The police had issued arrest warrants against Morris and the others on the technical charges that they had entered South West Africa and brought in stock without the necessary permits and unlawfully introduced firearms into the territory.

Sergeant van Niekerk was sent to Haib in the Bondelswarts Reserve to arrest Morris. Although Morris readily agreed to hand over his rifle, cartridges and Union rifle permit the Bondelswarts became unhappy when the sergeant tried to arrest Morris and would not let him do so.

Threatening actions, gestures and words followed and there seems no doubt that van Niekerk, after calling in vain on some of the Bondelswarts to assist him in the performance of his duty, warned the people that force would be used against them.

Bondelswart witnesses averred that van Niekerk had said that "die lood van die Goevernement sal nou op julle smelt" (the government's lead will now melt upon you). The Bondelswarts took this as a declaration of war, although Sergeant van Niekerk later emphatically denied that he had said this.

On 13 May Hofmeyr sent the head of the police, Major van Coller, with a strong force to Kalkfontein South (now Karasburg), a small station on the main railway line from South Africa to Windhoek which skirted the Reserve. Van Coller sent the Bondelswarts leader Jacobus Christian a message through Johan Noothout (the superintendent of the Reserve), asking him to meet him to hear an important message from Hofmeyr.

Jacobus Christian replied: "Dear Sir, I have received your letter and regret that I cannot come to see you and the Administrator. Firstly, my wife and I are sick. Sergeant van Niekerk has told me that I and my people will be destroyed by the Government within a couple of days. This has also been told to me by many witnesses and I am thus expecting to be killed as informed. Further, dear Commissioner, as you have been appointed to look after the interests of the Bondels, we are looking to you and not to the police. So, dear Sir, I am afraid to go to Driehoek and request you come to Haib. Kind regards to all, I am J Christian".

Hofmeyr wanted negotiations to continue, and so on 17 May, Johan Noothout and Monsignor Kolikowski, head of the Catholic mission in the Bondelswarts area, were sent to visit Jacobus Christian. In the negotiations it seems that Noothout exceeded his authority and said that if Morris reported to the magistrate at Warmbad "everything would be forgiven and forgotten and that they would only be tried for being without a pass, and that there would only be an enquiry about the rifles".

Noothout was not believed, and Jacobus Christian asked for written confirmation from Hofmeyr. Such confirmation was not forthcoming, but Hofmeyr offered to meet Jacobus Christian at a place selected by Hofmeyr.

According to historian Freislich, there is no doubt that the superintendent's behaviour in these negotiations convinced the Bondelswarts that Hofmeyr was not sincere in his offers to talk with Christian.

On 21 May 1922 Hofmeyr made further efforts to obtain an amicable settlement by sending Major van Coller to meet Jacobus Christian personally for a discussion of the difficulties.

Major van Coller was stopped by sentries who mounted the running-boards of his car and escorted him in. This was later interpreted by Hofmeyr as a gross insult.

Van Coller delivered the message that Hofmeyr demanded the surrender of Morris and four of his companions and of all arms in the Bondelswarts possession, but Christian rejected the demand. Jacobus Christian stated that the Bondelswarts would not surrender their arms and ammunition since the five men had not stolen anything, and Morris had already handed over his rifle to Sgt van Niekerk; besides which the Bondelswarts had no rifles to hand over because the Government had failed to return the rifles handed over by Jacobus in 1919, which he now requested be returned.

An invitation was then extended by Hofmeyr to Jacobus Christian, to meet him personally at Kalkfontein South, or at some other place outside of the Reserve to be agreed. However, Christian would only see Hofmeyr at Haib, the place where all the Bondelswarts had collected in readiness for the fight. No such meeting ever took place.

The Mandates Commission later suggested that all of the trouble might have been avoided had Hofmeyr shed a little of his dignity and gone to see Morris himself. Hofmeyr later said that he would have shown leniency if Morris had surrendered and might have given him a suspended sentence.

Hofmeyr said he wished for peace, and had tried hard for a peaceful settlement. While Hofmeyr conducted negotiations through intermediaries and letters, on 15 May Hofmeyr had already begun preparations for military action by calling for mounted volunteers and gathering together the government forces. Whether this gathering of troops was intended to increase pressure on the Bondelswarts to make a peaceful settlement is not clear, but it did not have this effect.

Hofmeyr wrote later that the Bondelswarts had been growing ever more insolent and the Europeans more panicky. He had not, he protested, sought the use of force, but when he attacked the time had come to "inflict a severe and lasting lesson".

==== The punitive expedition ====
The Bondelswarts appointed Morris as their military commander and "went into laager" with their women and children in the hills at Guruchas. The Bondelswarts fighters were estimated at 600 men of whom at most 200 were armed. They were poorly equipped and would be up against the formidable military power of the Administration.

When the government forces arrived, it became clear that the Bondelswarts were not prepared, given their lack of adequate armament. Between 22 and 25 May the Bondelswarts stole additional firearms and supplies from local white farmers, although none of the farmers were hurt.

In earlier skirmishes against the Germans who had been inexperienced fighting bush campaigns, the Bondelswarts had been successful in obtaining further arms and ammunitions by ambushing government soldiers, and they planned to use this tactic again. However, the Administration forces contained many who had combat experience in the Anglo-Boer War and were anticipating such tactics.

Hofmeyr arrived at Kalkfontein South on 23 May with his staff and over 100 troops, and this force was augmented over the next two days to a force of 370 mounted riflemen comprising police, civil servants and volunteers from the surrounding districts (farmers and war veterans) – together with two German mountain guns and four Vickers machine guns.

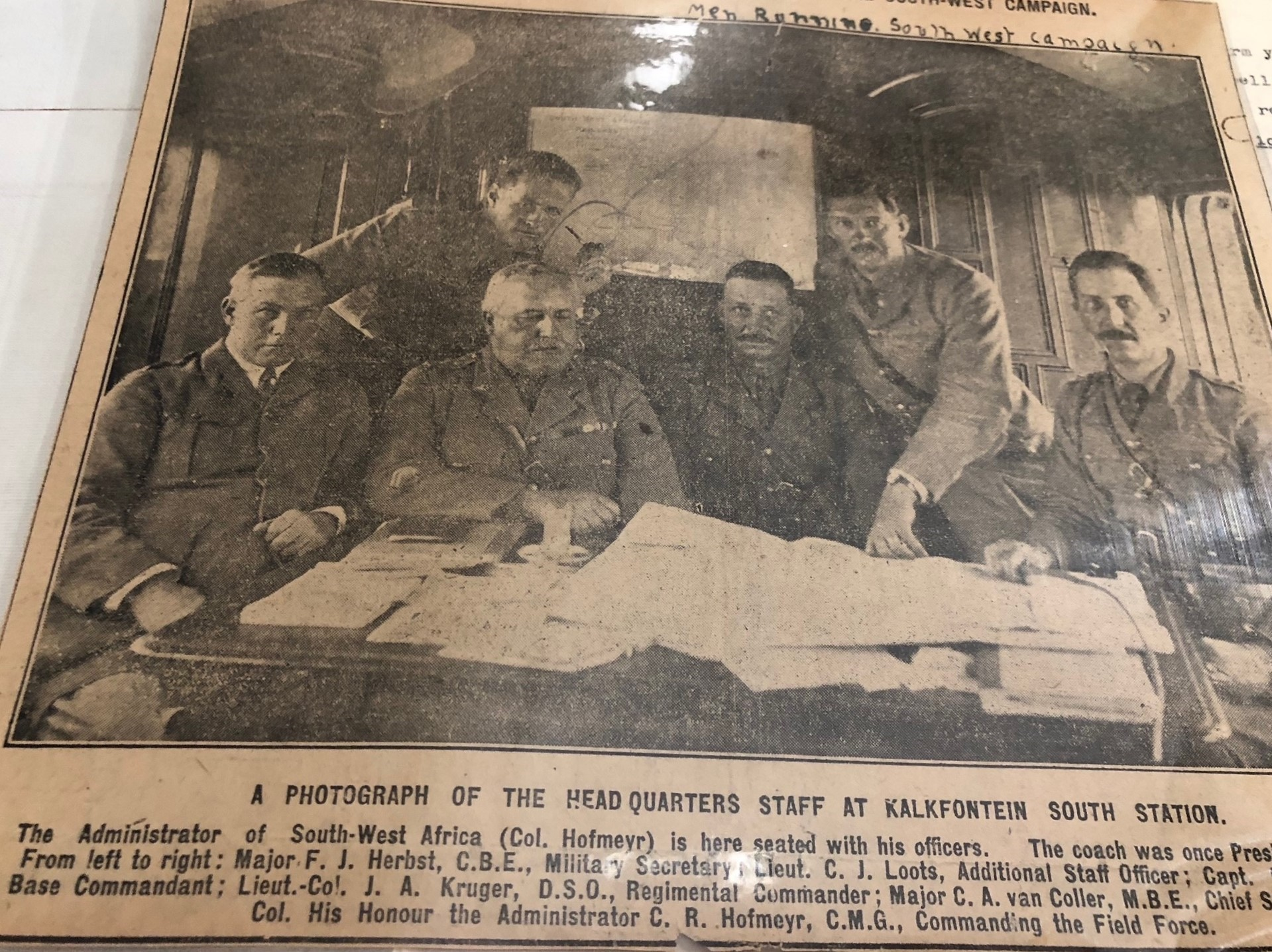
1922 Bondelswarts Punitive Expedition Headquarters Staff at Kalkfontein South Station including Colonel His Honour the Administrator GR Hofmeyr CMG, Commanding the Field Force

Although a civilian without military experience, Hofmeyr promoted himself to military rank and took personal command of the armed forces. To outrank the highest-ranking officer in South West Africa, a Lieutenant Colonel, Hofmeyr "temporarily" assumed the rank of Colonel.

The Windhoek Advertiser poked fun at the self-appointed commander-in-chief: "it was possible", the paper held, "that Hofmeyr possessed the military qualities of a Napoleon, but he had reached middle-age without giving proof of his capacities in that direction".

Hofmeyr requested that two aeroplanes be sent up from South Africa. Smuts ordered Colonel Pierre van Ryneveld to fly up from Pretoria with two De Havilland DH9 bombers with mounted machine guns. The DH9 had a capacity to carry around twenty 20-pound (9 kilogramme) Cooper bombs on each flight.

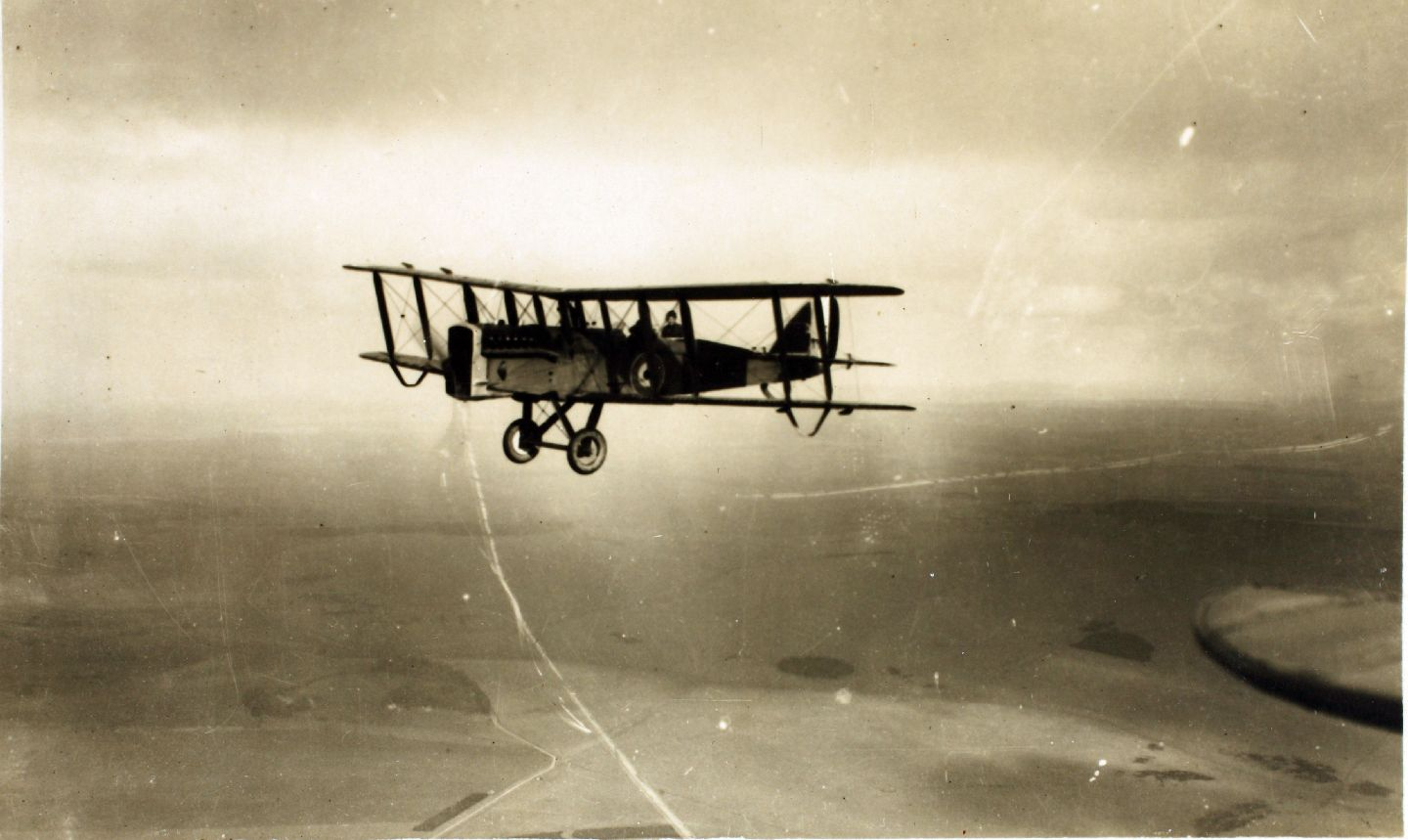
De Havilland DH-9 bomber with mounted machine guns

Hofmeyr stated "if force is needed ... the force used must be so overwhelming and so disposed that the retreat to the Orange River mountains is cut off". The entire Bondelswarts Reserve was to be surrounded and the tribesmen were to be driven into Guruchas and forced to surrender.

After some initial inconclusive skirmishes, the Administration troops started to close in on Guruchas. At 3pm the DH9s bombed and machine-gunned the Bondelswarts livestock, causing havoc, killing two children and wounding seven women and children.

Hofmeyr and the pilots later claimed that it was not known at the time that there were women and children in the laager.

Hofmeyr's ground troops advanced after the initial bombing and strafing and there was a heavy exchange of fire. The Bondelswarts suffered losses but the Administration's troops advanced cautiously.

At sunset the planes returned and made another run over the Bondelswart positions. This time bombs were dropped on the ridges south and south-east of the village but the Bondelswarts fighters were scattered across the hilltops at wide intervals and the bombing achieved very little.

The next morning, the Administration troops returned and burned the Bondelswarts huts to the ground. The planes swept in again. The people, who were crouched in whatever shelter they could find, heard once more the deafening explosions as the bombs burst one after another amongst the animals. The staccato rattle of their machine-guns could be heard above the engines and amongst the puffs of dust spurting up from the ground ahead of the planes animals pitched dead to the ground.

At this point around ninety men and seven hundred women and children surrendered, but around 150 Bondelswarts fighters had slipped away overnight. Given the unmatched reconnaissance power of the aeroplanes they were easily tracked down over the next days. After another forty-nine Bondelswarts had been killed, including Morris, all the Bondelswarts remaining cattle and donkeys were captured by the Administration forces, and the last of the Bondelswarts surrendered. In all, around 100 of the Bondelswarts had been killed, with 468 wounded and prisoners. Of the Administration forces two were killed and four or five wounded.

This was the first occasion when aeroplanes were used against tribesmen in southern Africa, and it must have struck terror into them.

Brown, writing in the Mail and Guardian in 1998 asserts that the Bondelswarts were more fearful of the machine guns used by the aeroplanes than by the bombs. He states "the airmen dropped about 100 bombs” although, according to van Ryneveld's evidence given later, in total sixteen bombs were dropped during the course of the revolt. Brown states that the warplanes fired several thousand rounds of Vickers machinegun fire. The surrendering Bondels said they didn't mind "as die voel drol kak" (if the bird dropped bombs), but in the machine gunning "dans is ons gebars" (we are done for).

Many of the Bondelswarts who had surrendered on 30 May at Guruchas reported that although they had put up white flags they had been fired on by the government soldiers, until an officer gave the order to cease fire. Major Herbst, the Secretary for South West Africa and an expert on Native affairs, later said that this incident was an accident, and that some children had been shot on the backs of their mothers who were trying to escape from Guruchas.

There were also reports of the beating or flogging of Bondelswarts prisoners, and the later investigation noted that proceedings had been taken against those responsible.

Jacobus Christian was tried in the High Court of South West Africa and convicted of engaging in active hostilities against His Majesty's forces. He was defended pro deo by Advocate Israel Goldblatt, who subsequently wrote about the punitive expedition in his book on the history of South West Africa. The court sentenced Jacobus Christian to five years' imprisonment with hard labour, but also paid tribute to his character and conduct.

Goldblatt comments in his book that the Bondelswarts, as a consequence of their defeat, were reduced to a miserably poor community. Most of their stock had stampeded across the country and a number had died of thirst. Only about one half of their stock was returned. However, unlike following other rebellions, the Administration did not impose additional penalties.

==== Initial press reaction ====
The ferocity and single-mindedness of the military campaign against the Bondelswarts shocked even the local white settler press in South West Africa. An editorial in the Windhoek Advertiser maintained that the "mind revolts at the thought of a bloody campaign against a body of ill-armed savages. The nobler course would have been one of patient perseverance rather than ferocious punishment".

The Bondelswarts affair was widely reported in South Africa, where the press and members of parliament called for an investigation. Despite widespread criticism, Smuts stood up for the actions of Hofmeyr, and told Parliament in Cape Town: "A great bloodletting has been averted by prompt action".

International reaction was critical. The London Times printed a brief article on the bombing sent by their correspondent in Cape Town within the month, and thereafter newspapers from Ireland to India picked up the story.

==== Hofmeyr's initial report ====
On 22 June 1922 Hofmeyr submitted a report on the Bondelswarts affair to the South African Parliament, before it had become clear that a commission of enquiry would be established by the South African government

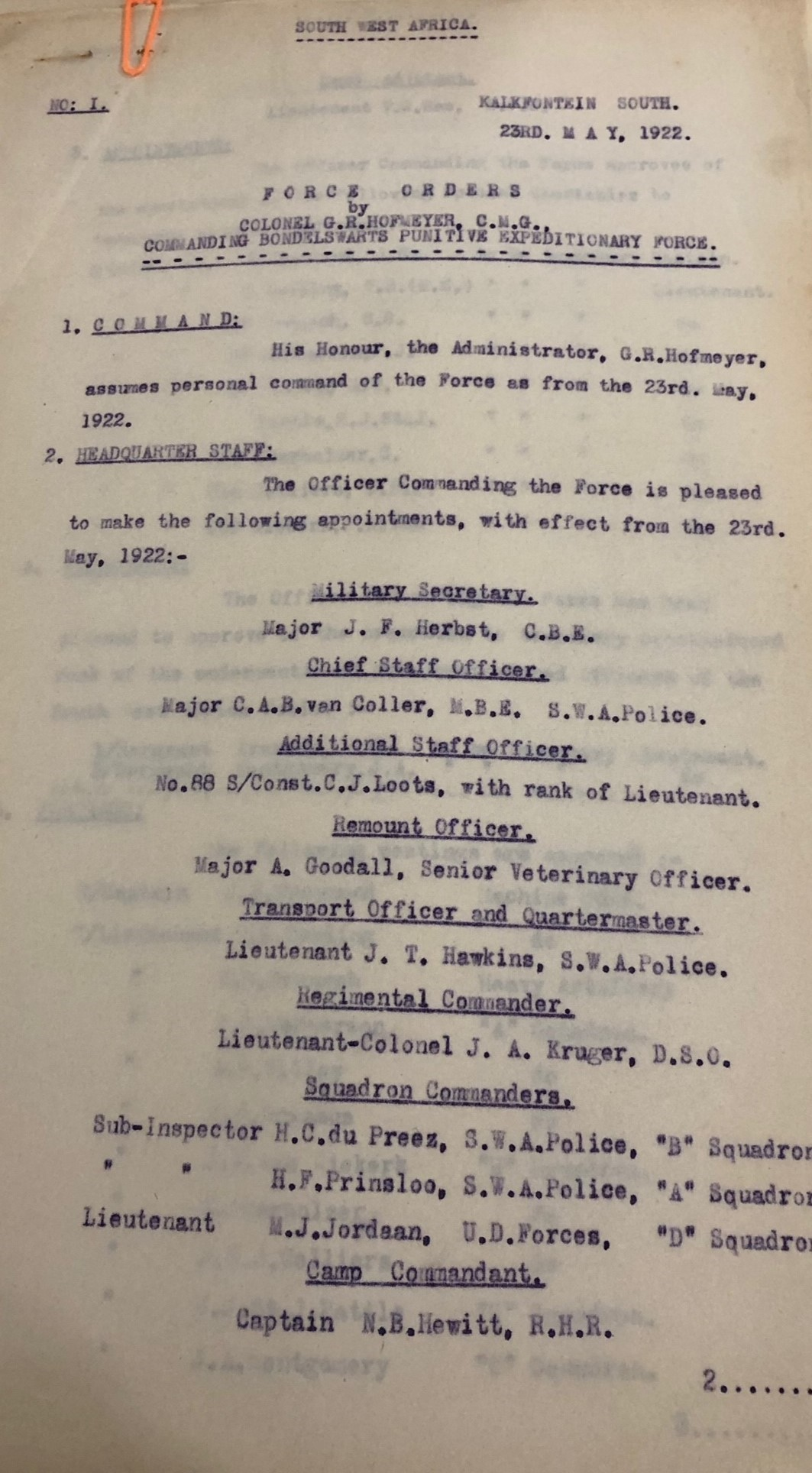
1922 Force Orders by Colonel GR Hofmeyr CMG Commanding Bondelswarts Punitive Expeditionary Force 23 May 1922

Hofmeyr's force orders described him as commanding the "Bondelswarts Punitive Expeditionary Force", but by the time of Hofmeyr's report the action was no longer described as a "punitive expedition" and the description had been changed, presumably for public consumption, to refer to the "Bondelswarts Rising".

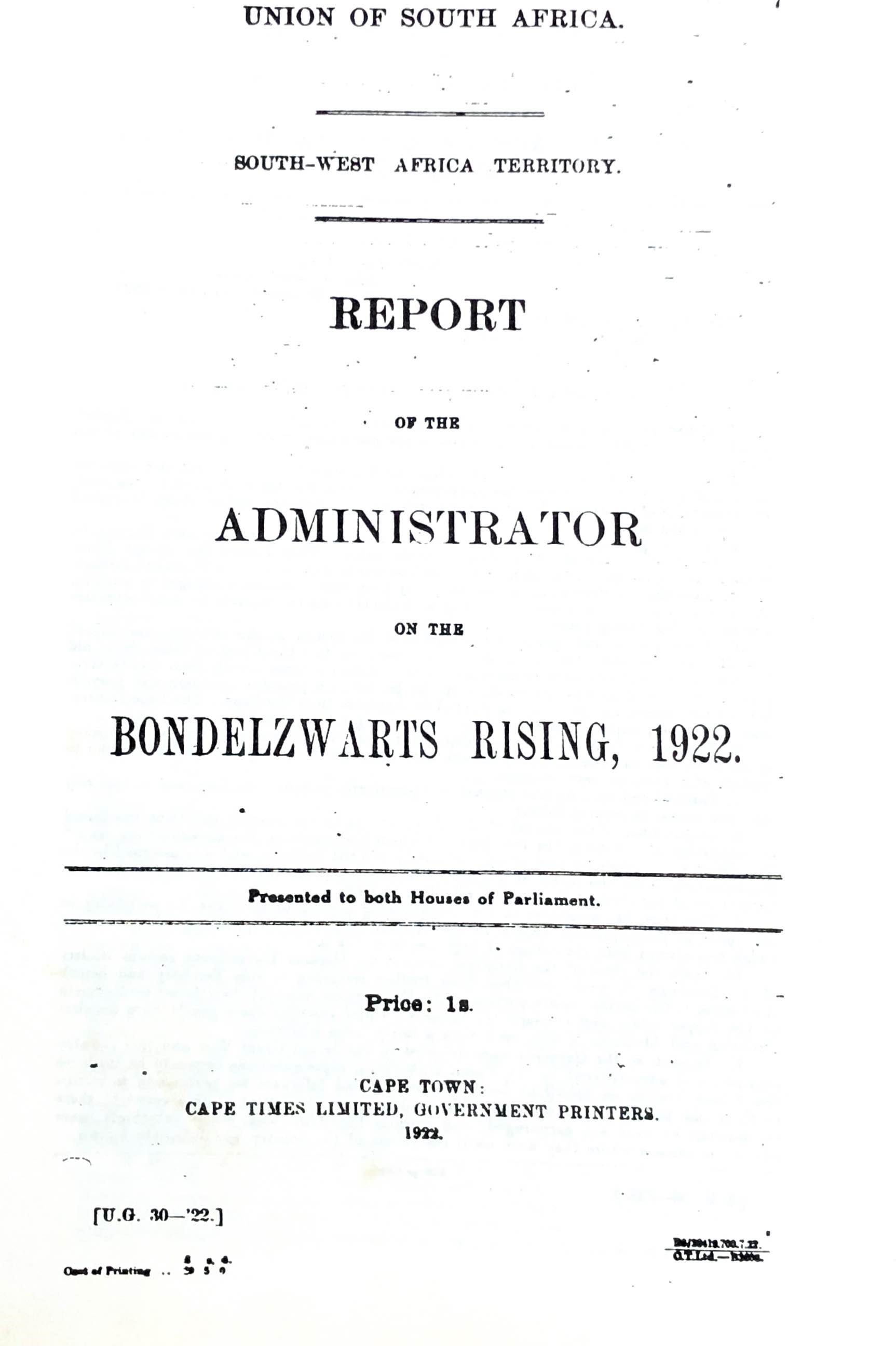
Report of the Administrator of South West Africa on the Bondelswarts Rising, issued 19 June 1922

By the time of the later South African Commission of Enquiry the description of the affair had been amended again to refer to the "Rebellion of the Bondelzwarts".

Historian Lewis shows that Smuts had input into the writing of Hofmeyr's report, and suggested changes to make the report more likely to be acceptable to the Mandates Commission. Nonetheless, the report is unrepentant and Hofmeyr seems to have had few regrets at this stage.

Hofmeyr states that before the fighting had begun he had received reports of "considerable unrest among the Natives" in other areas, and that "some of these were in league with the Bondelswarts and ready to co-operate with them ".

Hofmeyr states that "in fact, a general panic was once more approaching, and nearly every responsible person believed that a general rising was pending". Hofmeyr goes on to say that neither he nor Major Herbst shared this view, but nonetheless "I could no longer delay taking the most expeditious action to re-assure the public as the risk was too great to allow matters to drift".

Elsewhere in the report Hofmeyr says that he had received information that convinced him of the "possibility, if not probability, of the whole country going ablaze and the history of German times being repeated unless a peaceful settlement was quickly announced ... or a decisive blow was quickly struck.

Hofmeyr felt that Jacobus Christian had deliberately "evaded all possibility of a peaceful settlement" and that "the Administration had exercised great patience and, short of going on its knees to the Hottentots, had done everything it was possible to do, in order to avoid bloodshed".

Despite the overwhelming military superiority of the Administration forces, Hofmeyr states that "It was only when I realised the meagreness of my forces in the face of overwhelming difficulties that I reluctantly asked for help from the Air Force". "The use of force was no seeking of mine and I regret that it was necessary, but when once it became clear that there was no alternative I was determined to inflict a severe and lasting lesson".

Freislich attributes the puzzling aspects of the campaign to the personal failing of Hofmeyr – citing his vanity, ambition and fear of criticism.

Emmett comments that although there were signs of panic (initially difficulty was experienced in raising a force for the campaign) and even clearer indications of bungling due to Hofmeyr's lack of military experience, he believes that Freislich's explanation is not a complete nor a convincing one.

To Emmett, it seemed improbable that Hofmeyr would have been retained as Administrator until 1926 if his personal failings had been so glaringly obvious, particularly as the suppression of the Bondelswarts rebellion raised an unprecedented international furore.

=== Administrator's Annual Report for 1921 (issued June 1922) ===
Under the terms of the Mandate, an annual report was required to be submitted to the Mandates Commission by the Administrator. The first of these reports for South West Africa, relating to the 1921 calendar year, was issued by Hofmeyr on 30 June 1922.

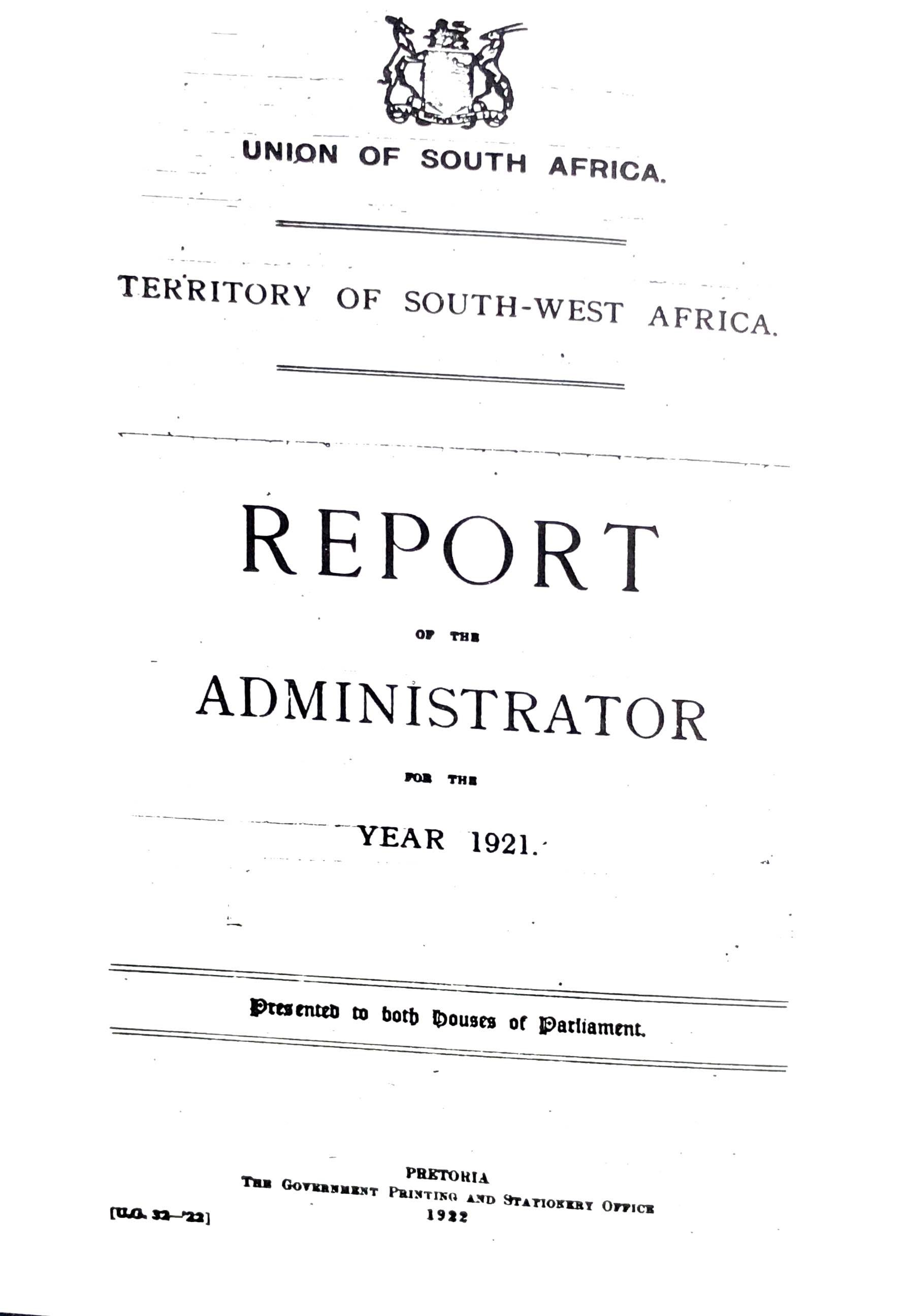
Report of the Administrator of South West Africa for 1921

The 1921 Report referred to a census and reported a total European population of 19,432, including 10,673 British and 7,855 Germans. Notwithstanding the "sacred trust", no mention is made of the Native population, although elsewhere in the report it is noted that while it is not possible to obtain a satisfactory census there are an estimated 203,000 Natives, of which the 115,000 Ovambos are the largest group.

In relation to the administration of justice, there is separate reporting for "Europeans" (who were convicted of incest, bigamy, housebreaking and theft) and for "Natives" (who were convicted of murder, homicide, rape and housebreaking). Distinctions in the Report are drawn for "Native on European" and "Native on Native" crimes. No record appears of "European on Native" crimes. It is noted that the daily average for prisoners in custody is 9 for Europeans, and 274 for Native Males.

The 1921 Report includes a footnote which reveals a heartbreaking clash of cultures. "Three male Natives convicted for murder were wild Bushmen, who were found guilty of killing a newly born Bushman child. One of the accused was its father. The child's mother had died in giving it birth, and as there was no woman in the kraal with milk who could have reared it, the accused, convinced that it would in any event have died very soon, buried it with its mother. The accused were all sentenced to death, but their sentence was commuted to six months' imprisonment with hard labour".

Death sentences were commuted by the Governor General rather than by the Administrator.

=== Increasing political reaction to the Bondelswarts punitive expedition (July 1922) ===
Smuts wrote to Hofmeyr on 5 July 1922 to tell his old friend not to seize the Bondelswart's land, which Hofmeyr had been planning to do. Smuts was worried about a coming storm among those who "favour Native interests & in League of Nations".

On 19 July 1922 under pressure from the South African Parliament, Smuts agreed to an investigation into the affair by the Native Affairs Commission of South Africa.

Smuts was already under pressure as a result of the Bulhoek Massacre and the Rand Revolt.

In the Rand Revolt of March 1922, Smuts had used 20,000 troops, artillery, tanks and bomber aircraft to crush a rebellion that started when white miners went on strike in opposition to government proposals to allow non-whites to do more skilled and semi-skilled work previously reserved to whites only.

At the Bulhoek Massacre of 24 May 1921 (almost exactly a year before the Bondelswarts affair) eight hundred South African police and soldiers armed with Maxim machine guns and two field artillery guns killed 163 and wounded 129 members of a Xhosa religious sect known as "Israelites" who had been armed with knobkerries, assegais and swords and who had refused to vacate land they regarded as holy to them.

On 25 July 1922 Colonel Wedgwood of the British Labour party raised the Bondelswarts affair in the House of Commons. He wanted to know what steps Britain was taking and questioned the use of aeroplanes to suppress the rebellion. Winston Churchill, as Secretary of State for Colonial Affairs, dismissed the enquiry, huffing "I hope we shall find something better to do... than attack our dominions."

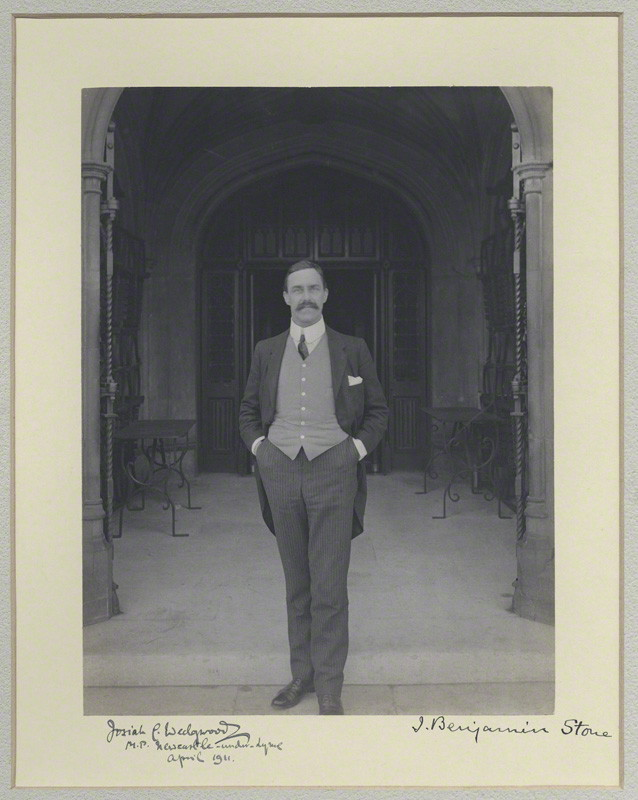
Colonel Wedgwood of the British Labour party raised question in the British House of Commons about the use of aeroplanes. Winston Churchill dismissed the enquiry, saying "I hope we shall find something better to do ... than attach our dominions."

=== Governor General's visit (August 1922) ===
The Governor General of the Union of South Africa, Prince Arthur of Connaught, visited South West Africa in August 1922.

The Administration, anxious to create a good impression, had arranged for the Prince to be greeted by the headmen of the territory's various communities. To ensure nothing untoward would occur, Native Affairs officers and magistrates travelled across the country to collect and edit the speeches to be made by each headman. The Administration clearly had little trust in the Native chiefs.

The American Consulate General reported that it was apparent that there was considerable dissatisfaction among the original German population. "Many of them continue to demonstrate their extreme unwillingness to change their allegiance, and at the same time express an equally strong desire to obtain a greater say in the administration of the territory".

=== League of Nations Assembly reacts to the Bondelswarts punitive expedition (September 1922) ===
When the Assembly of the League of Nations opened in Geneva in September 1922, Dantes Bellegarde of Haiti, one of the very few black delegates in the Assembly, denounced South Africa, saying that the Bondelswarts had been harassed by the government but had not rebelled; nevertheless the administration had sent "all the material of modern warfare – machine-guns, artillery and aeroplanes" against them.

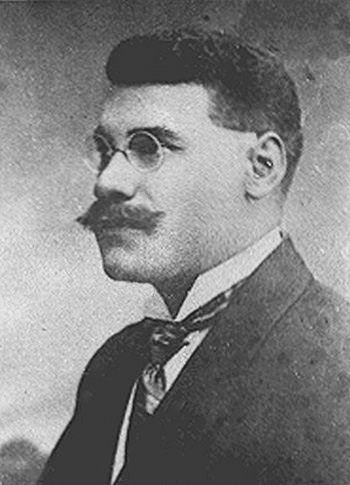
Dantès Bellegarde, Haitian diplomat and historian, one of the very few black delegates in the Assembly of the League of Nations in 1922

"That women and children should have been massacred in the name of the League of Nations and under its protection is an abominable outrage which we cannot suffer" he declared, to prolonged applause. Bellegarde felt that the rising had been caused by the prohibitive Dog Tax and intimated that the suppression of the Bondelswarts was a brutal business.

The South African representative, Sir Edgar Walton, High Commissioner for South Africa in London, could reply that the incident was under investigation, but the galvanised Assembly agreed that the Mandates Commission needed to look into the whole sorry situation.

Walton informed Smuts from Geneva on 16 September 1922 that "the general impression here is, first, that the treatment of this tribe was far from humane; second, that the attack on them was not justified, and third, that the operations were conducted in a brutal manner".

Whether Walton's view was affected by Hofmeyr's critical memorandum on Walton's Inner Workings of the Constitutional Convention is not known.

Walton continued: "I have assured everybody here that Hofmeyr is one of the most humane men I know, and that anyhow you had ordered a thorough investigation and would certainly see that the enquiry was ample and searching."

=== South African Commission of enquiry into the Bondelswarts "rebellion" (March 1923) ===
==== The SA Commission Report ====
The South African Commission of enquiry into the Bondelswarts affair appointed by Smuts reported in March 1923.

The Commissioners had taken evidence from 124 witnesses, ranging from Hofmeyr himself, other Administration staff, police, military personnel and volunteers involved in the campaign, as well as the chief and others of the Bondelswarts tribe.

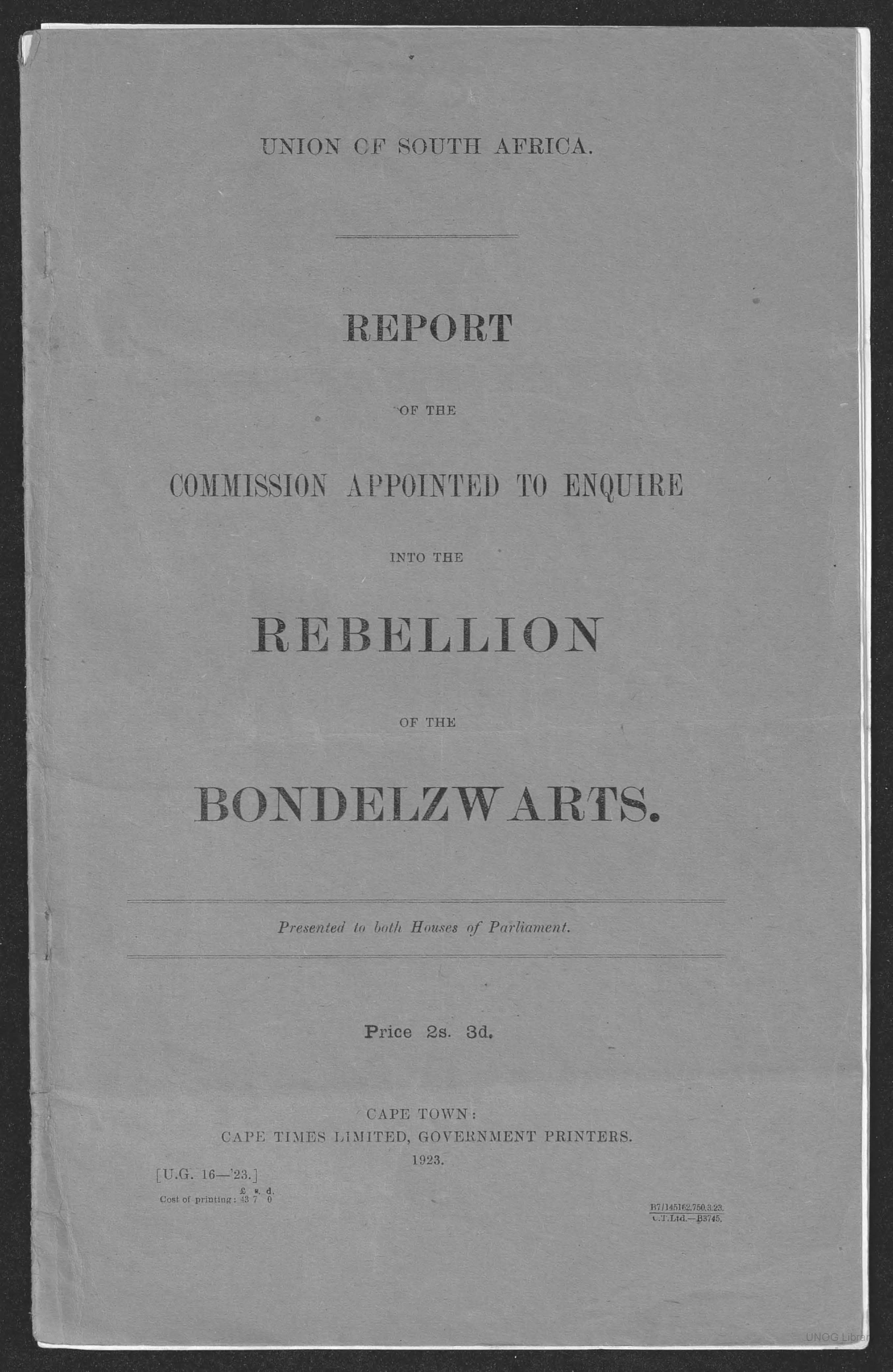
1923 Report of the Commission appointed to enquire into the Bondelswarts Rebellion

The majority, Senator AW Roberts and Dr CT Loram, who had deep roots in the Cape's tradition of tolerance, expressed views critical of Hofmeyr and the Administration, but General Lemmer, a comrade of Botha and Smuts in the Anglo-Boer war and since then a faithful follower of theirs in politics dissented in many important respects.

Historian Eric Walker described it thus: General Lemmer "a stout old Transvaal general, indeed applauded the Native policy of the Administration, but the majority guardedly censured it".

Lewis comments that from a review of the draft reports it is clear that the majority were initially much more critical of Hofmeyr's role and of his Native Administration generally. However, General Lemmer acted as an effective brake, and his draft report was far more complimentary to Hofmeyr, denying allegations of incompetence or ill-treatment of Bondelswarts prisoners.

It was at General Lemmer's insistence that all references to the alleged ill-treatment or shooting of prisoners, the bungling of certain aspects of the military operations by Hofmeyr and in general any severe criticism of Hofmeyr's Administration was deleted from the final SA Commission Report.

The SA Commission Report focussed on the deep divisions between the Administration and the Bondelswarts. The Bondelswarts "considered themselves the equal of white men and were unwilling to accept the position of a servile race; they had a deep distrust, dating from the time when they first came into contact with the European... a distrust ... intensified by the way in which the Europeans' occupation of the land had driven them further and further north to the rocky country in which they now live".

The police interviewed by the Commissioners had reported that the Bondelswarts were "insolent, lazy and thievish"; the Bondelswarts witnesses regarded the police as "provocative, unnecessarily severe and harsh".

The Commission found that while the new Administration had had good intentions, "no adequate effort" had been made "to build up the people under the new conditions of life". It found that there was no real fixed Native policy, and trenchantly observed that "if efforts equal to those which were made to facilitate the settlement of Europeans on the land had been made in the case of the indigenous Natives, the latter would have had less cause for complaints".

The SA Commission Report found that "it is much to be regretted that a meeting between [Hofmeyr] and the Bondelswarts did not take place... [Hofmeyr] could speak with ultimate authority, and he would hear at first hand the complaints of the men, who, after all, were not an enemy but citizens of the country".

The SA Commission Report continued that "when considering the evidence dealing with the period between the visit of van Niekerk and the breaking out of hostilities [it was clear that that Hofmeyr] wished for peace ... and showed patience and forbearance." This was insufficient for General Lemmer, who defended Hofmeyr by saying that Hofmeyr "had done his utmost to bring about such an interview."

In relation to the use of aeroplanes, the SA Commission Report stated that "of the terror which these "great birds" inspired upon the Natives there can be no doubt. It was evident in the testimony given by almost every Native witness." The Commission felt that the aeroplanes had proved efficient and effective.

The majority were fulsome in their condemnation of the use of aeroplanes without warning: "some means of giving warning to the Natives of the intention of the Administration to use these weapons on the Bondelswarts positions at Guruchas should have been taken by the military leaders and should have been accompanied by a formal demand to surrender. This was especially necessary as almost all the women and children were with the men on the hills. Such warning would have led to the separation of the women from the fighting men and might have brought about a surrender of the Native forces. Not only was no such warning given but the aviators received instructions to avoid being seen by the Bondelswarts on their journey from Kalkfontein to Guruchas."

General Lemmer once again defended the forthright actions of the Administration, saying that severe fighting had already taken place before the aeroplanes were used and quoted the aviators who said it had not been possible to distinguish men from women and children.

Lewis comments that another controversial aspect of the military operations was the comparatively low number of Bondelswarts wounded, and states that rumours of the shooting of Bondelswarts prisoners were rife.

While all reference to this was left out of the final SA Commission Report, attention was given to it in the drafts.

Also left out of the final SA Commission Report was any mention of the evidence relating to the flogging of prisoners. Lewis states that some of the rebels were beaten by police at Warmbad, who had been instructed by Hofmeyr to collect "evidence" that the revolt had been planned for some time and influenced by outside agitators.

One of the policemen told the Commission that "the thrashings were given in connection with the taking of statements. This took place on several occasions". Another, who was later fined and dismissed from the police for his part in the beatings, told the Commission that "many Hottentots were sent to me to give strokes because they did not make the right declaration".

The Commission recommended the establishment of a Department of Native Affairs, adequate Reserves, encouragement of industrial and agricultural development, improved education, improved regulations for Natives in service, and consultation with Natives before introducing legislation.

The SA Commission Report concluded that "the resistance seems to the Commission to be the action of a people driven to extremity by poverty and by an acute sense of injury and injustice, real or imaginary. The whole Native problem, not only as it affects the Bondelswarts, but as it exists in the whole Territory, requires the most careful and exhaustive examination in order to bring it in harmony with the idea that the Native is a sacred trust to the Mandatory state".

==== Press reaction to the SA Commission Report ====
In Windhoek Die Suidwes Nuus condemned the SA Commission Report as going out of its way to protect the "Hottentots", and strongly supported General Lemmer's minority viewpoints.

In Cape Town, The Cape Times in an editorial on 11 April was severely critical of the SA Commission Report, deploring the lack of unanimity existing in the Native policy of the Union. "The real trouble is, as General Lemmer's comments on his colleagues' conclusions show, that there are still many South Africans who are wholly sceptical about the possibility of Native progress. To such men the degradation of the Bondelswarts is a natural fate; their discontent a mere semi-animal unruliness to be kicked or clubbed into submission; their grievance impudent presumption upon the forbearance of the white races."

In Britain, an article in the New Statesman in May 1923 strongly criticised the report saying it was "one of the most unsatisfactory documents ever published on a punitive expedition", that it had not proved that the Bondelswarts had actually rebelled, pointing out that until the Government military operations began there had been "neither the pillage, arson nor murder; the Bondels did not touch a single hair of the head of a single white man".

The Manchester Guardian also disparaged the SA Commission Report when it came out, and Sir Sydney Olivier attacked South Africa's handling of the affair in a letter to the London Times on 2 June 1923, calling the suppression of the rebellion a "massacre".

==== Hofmeyr's reaction to the SA Commission Report ====
Hofmeyr's reaction to the report was swift and unrepentant. The report had been issued on 19 March 1923, and on 4 April Hofmeyr submitted to both Houses of Parliament his Memorandum on the report.

Hofmeyr agreed with all of General Lemmer's dissenting comments, and felt that they "effectually disposed of the arguments or rather statements advanced by the majority"

The SA Commission Report majority said that "in the interests of the country it is to be regretted that steps were not taken to formulate a satisfactory Native policy and settle the Natives before the country was opened to European occupation."

Hofmeyr cites General Lemmer's rebuttal of this, and without self-reflection continues as if writing a lawyer's letter: "the public will in the first place be surprised to learn that no information on this point was sought from me by the Commission; ... that, wholly contrary to one of the most ordinary principles of justice – audi alteram partem – I was not given any opportunity to admit or deny the evidence or to meet any charge framed therein. I was condemned without trial; a privilege accorded a common felon in every civilised country."

Hofmeyr denied that the Dog Tax had been imposed to force Blacks to work. However, in giving evidence before the Commission Major Herbst had said "these dogs went about hunting game and it would irritate the farmers. If [the Blacks] could live by hunting they would not work".

Hofmeyr said that after Major van Coller, Fleck and Noothout had received an armed escort when visiting the Bondelswarts, he would not have gone to the Bondelswarts and suffered similar humiliation. "In the face of this action the Commission has the temerity to suggest that I personally should have gone to Haib to see Christian".

As Lewis states, considering what was at stake, Hofmeyr's elevated regard for his own dignity and status was misplaced. There were many precedents of greater men than he who had humbled themselves in order to avoid bloodshed. In this regard Lewis mentions Cecil Rhodes meeting the Ndebele leaders in the Matopos in 1896 in the Second Matabele War and Smuts and General Louis Botha braving a hostile crowd to talk to strike leaders in 1913.

Many witnesses to the commission (both white and Black) felt that if Hofmeyr had met the Bondelswarts personally things would have been peacefully resolved.

Hofmeyr did not regret the use of aeroplanes: "their use was unavoidable in the circumstances in which we found ourselves. I cannot agree with the Commission in its finding that warning should have been given to the Hottentots of the intended use of this weapon. Not only would it not have had the slightest effect in inducing a surrender, but it would have defeated the whole plan of action... the only way open to me with my small force was to surround them in a concentrated position and to force them to surrender by aeroplane bombardment. I had tried all peaceful means of securing a surrender, and there was only the employment of force left."

Hofmeyr did show compassion in relation to the harm to innocents. "It is of course very regrettable that a few women and children were injured."

Lewis notes that the SA Commission Report seems to have stung Hofmeyr into a state of irrational anger. In a private letter to Smuts written after the SA Commission Report was released, Hofmeyr felt that the majority had "become so obsessed with one aim that whatever means might be necessary to that end, their great opportunity had come for proving their faith that a Dutch South African must for ever be banned from exercising authority in Native Administration in South Africa. To such a pitch of racial delirium had they brought themselves...".

Hofmeyr then alleged that the majority were under the influence of "European political wirepullers, office seekers, newspaper influences, ulterior-motive informers and street tittle-tattling". Not, perhaps, Hofmeyr's finest hour.

As Lewis conjectures, one wonders what Hofmeyr's reaction would have been if he had been shown the draft reports.

=== Hofmeyr turns down a British knighthood ===
In 1914 Hofmeyr had been appointed a Companion of the Order of St Michael and St George (CMG). In 1923, Smuts intended to put Hofmeyr's name forward for his appointment as Knight Commander of the Order of St Michael and St George (KCMG), which would have entitled him to use the title "Sir", but Hofmeyr demurred.

Smuts wrote to Hofmeyr on 20 April 1923 stating that "you have told me that you do not feel at liberty to accept the honour of KCMG for which I intended to submit your name to the King. You appear to feel that your action would be misunderstood.... I have been willing to submit your name as your great public services fully entitle you to the honour, and also as a mark of the appreciation in which I hold these services at a time when you are subjected to a certain measure of press criticism. Public recognition would range the government behind you and be a proof that you do not stand alone."

Smuts continues: "I wish to add how deeply I appreciate the manner in which you have carried out your arduous duties in S.W. Africa and how fervently I wish you complete success in carrying your heavy task to a complete conclusion."

=== Hofmeyr's 1922 Annual Report (April 1923) ===
While the reactions to the Bondelswarts affair swirled, Hofmeyr released his 1922 Annual Report.

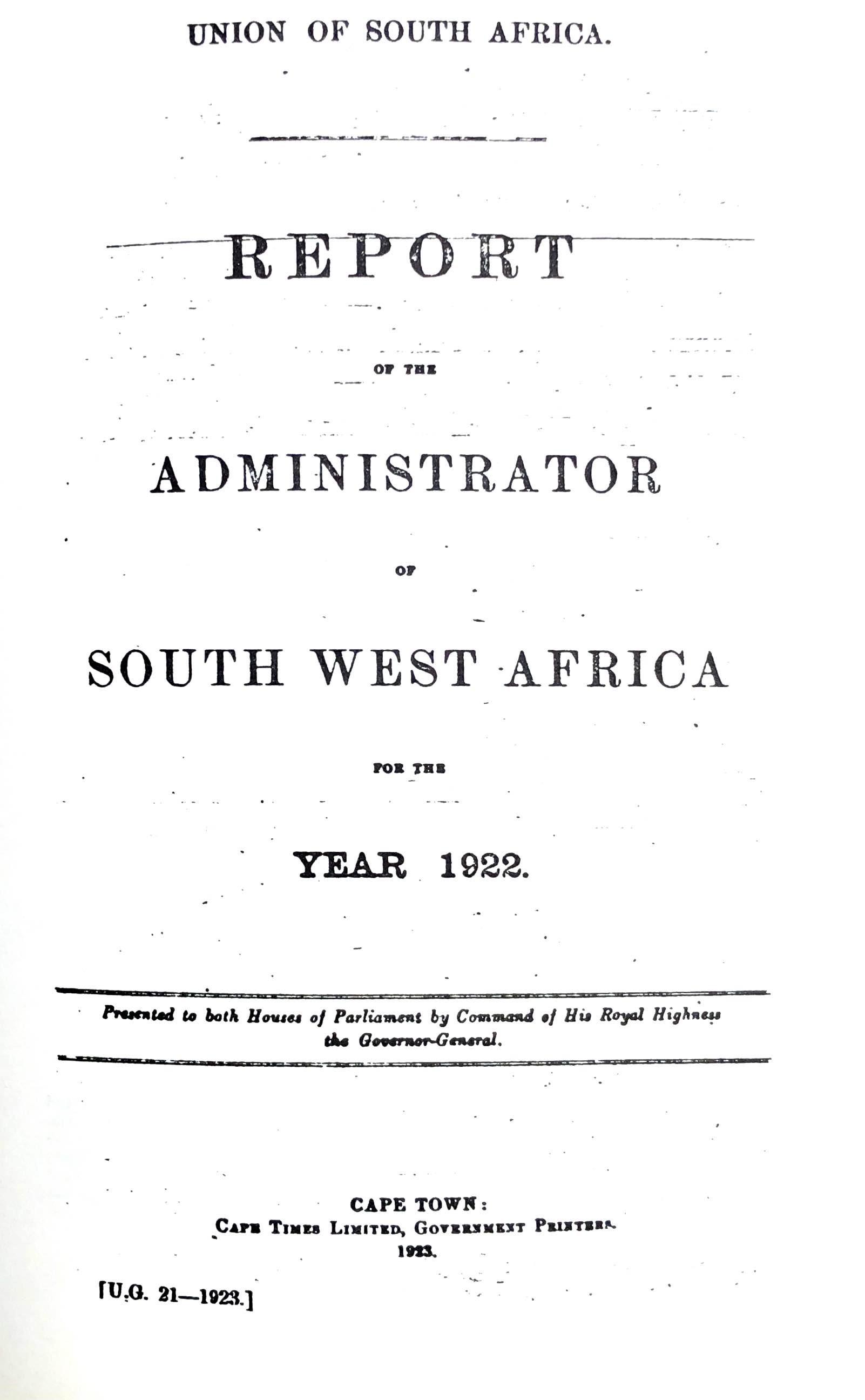
Report of the Administrator of South West Africa for 1922

Under pressure from the white settlers, Hofmeyr listed out the ways in which the Administration had eased the paths of the white settlers and "modified the Land Settlement Laws in favour of settlers".

In addition, Hofmeyr had tightened restrictions on the Natives. "Arms and ammunition can only be obtained by a Coloured person on a permit from the Administrator... No permits have been granted by the Administrator during the past year".

Hofmeyr continued to struggle with Native policy. He was unable to be complimentary towards the Herero, despite acknowledging their harsh treatment by the Germans. Hofmeyr states that the Herero "are a proud and intelligent race and at the time of the arrival of the Germans were powerful and wealthy, possessed of the best lands and enormous herds of stock. Their last war in 1908 left them landless paupers. To prevent recovery the authorities forbade them acquiring stock and so to maintain a livelihood they were forced to work".

The obvious redress would be to restore land and allow the Herero to rebuild their herds. However, Hofmeyr sees it differently: "It was only by the exercise of a large amount of tact and patience and forceful persuasion that the military administration was then able to maintain a supply of labour for which effort there has been very little, if any, gratitude displayed by the community."

Hofmeyr also reflected on the grim fate of the Hottentots. "[They] were prosperous and possessed of large herds of stock before the invasion of the white man and the clash of interests. Their several wars with the Germans soon reduced them to a state of abject poverty. Tribal government by chiefs was abolished, the land (except a Reserve in the Warmbad district ... for the Bondelswarts), confiscated and the remnants of the tribes placed in service with the farmers and others".

In relation to the Natives as workers, Hofmeyr was disrespectful. In his view "as a general rule the Natives are poor workers and stupid. The vast majority would prefer to be idle ... the Herero ... is stubborn and proud. Perhaps only the next generation will realise the necessity for labour taking its due share in the economic development of a country". The thought that the Natives may have had different views on the felicity of becoming labourers for whites does not occur to Hofmeyr.

Perhaps in response to the views expressed in the SA Commission Report, Hofmeyr complains that "European friends of the Natives have asserted that we have not dealt fairly with the Natives". Hofmeyr's response is that this cannot be done where European interests and public opinion must have primacy. "The best answer ... is the fact that today the Natives ... are the owners of 42,979 head of cattle and 511,150 sheep and goats. We might have made faster progress in regard to providing more land for them but with what result? Much of the land recommended by the Land Commission has been found to be unsuitable by the searching drought and we have found better and more suitable land by patient investigation...".

Hofmeyr felt constrained to respect European public opinion. "The person whose desire is to have an immediate adjustment of all Native wrongs and grievances regardless of its effect on the European people is no friend of the Natives. European public opinion in this country has not yet been educated up to Union standards, in fact is decidedly hostile thereto and if the relationship between Black and White is to be improved, festina lente (make haste slowly) is alone the motto under which it can be achieved.

This resulted in Hofmeyr neglecting to adjust Native policy to bring it in harmony with the idea that the Native is a sacred trust to the Mandatory state, as recommended by the SA Commission Report and as required under the League of Nations Mandate.

=== Naturalisation of Germans ===
In contrast to Hofmeyr's insistence that Natives must come second, he showed a touching solicitude for the Germans in South West Africa, offering them automatic naturalisation in 1923 (and representation in the Legislative Assembly in 1925).

Smuts was whole-heartedly behind this policy. In a letter to a representative of the German Government Smuts states that "the Germans of South West Africa, whose successful and conscientious work I highly appreciate, will materially help in building an enduring European civilisation on the African continent, which is the main task of the Union".

Smuts elaborated in a letter to Marquis Theodoli of the Mandates Commission, trying to reconcile the primacy of whites with the Mandate requirements to develop all inhabitants of the territory.

Smuts writes that "I have in no way abated my belief in the Mandate system, and any proposal for the special treatment of the White population is in no sense meant to weaken the beneficent functions entrusted to the League in respect of the Native populations of Mandated territories. I still look upon the Mandate system as a great step in advance so far as backward Native peoples are concerned... but the Mandates Commission will agree with me that the administration of the Whites is something quite different and can safely be left to the Mandatory power...the majority of the White population are... accustomed to our free system of self-government. For them it would be impossible to apply any other form of government than the free democratic regime to which they have been accustomed in the Union...to extend our institutions ... to the exclusion of the comparatively large German minority would be in every way undesirable..."

Smuts argues for equal treatment for whites. "Our whole policy in South West Africa has been to extend uniform equal treatment as far as possible to both sections of the White population".

Smuts' proposed a further intricate but tenuous argument: "Any system based on differential treatment [for Europeans] would only lead to unrest and agitation, which would not only be undesirable so far as the Whites are concerned, but would also in the long run produce regrettable reactions among the Native inhabitants."

"The acceptance of a uniform Union citizenship under a general law seems the simplest solution, and it commends itself generally to both sections of the White population in South West Africa... I therefore appreciate the action of the Council and the Mandates Commission in agreeing to this.".

Unfortunately the Mandates Commission was not brave enough to insist on the Administration providing equal treatment for all inhabitants as was implied under the Mandate.

=== SA parliamentary debate on the SA Commission Report (May 1923) ===
The South African parliament debated the SA Commission Report into the Bondelswarts affair at the end of May 1923.

The opposition Labour Party called the Bondelswarts affair a "blot on the escutcheon of South Africa". Colonel Creswell, (Leader of the South African Labour Party, and later part of the coalition government with Hertzog, pointed out that Smuts' "attitude in dealing with the disturbances was "you must obey our will". There should have been more humane statesmanship."

Arthur Barlow, Labour member for Bloemfontein North, blamed the tactlessness of the police for the revolt, and the Government for its mal-administration of the Bondelswarts and its neglect of the "sacred trust" of the Mandate. Barlow was later to say that "General Smuts made a mistake in regard to the Bondelswarts. He should have dismissed Gys Hofmeyr on the spot. The latter lost his head".

Barlow predicted that the outside world, particularly the Blacks, liberals and the Labour Party in Britain would attack the Union's race policies in the League of Nations, saying "our name is going to stink in the nostrils of the outside world".

Smuts in turn denied that the Bondelswarts had any substantial grievances, stating that "they are a Native people with simple minds – they misunderstand things and exaggerate others, and in one way or another a whole psychology grows up in their minds which in the end brings forth rebellion".

Smuts defended Hofmeyr vigorously, saying: "whatever [the Bondelswarts'] grievances, whatever their reasons or their action – and they may have had just and substantial grievances – in the ultimate result a rebellion was brewing there, and it was the swift action of [Hofmeyr] at the last moment which prevented a very terrible catastrophe".

Smuts continued: "I think the use of the aeroplane was perfectly justified" although he incorrectly asserted "... they were not used on the women and children".

Ever the smooth politician, using words open to multiple interpretations to mollify as many listeners as possible, Smuts ended his speech by saying "I think we should do everything possible to set ourselves right in the eyes of the world". Whether those words were meant to indicate contrition and regret is not known.

=== Major Herbst before the Mandates Commission (May 1923) ===
The SA Commission Report and Hofmeyr's Report on the Bondelswarts rising was sent to the Mandates Commission together with the Administrator's 1922 Annual Report

Major Herbst, the Secretary for South West Africa, appeared before the Mandates Commission in May 1923 to speak to the three reports. The Mandates Commission complained that the two reports on the Bondelswarts had been submitted without comment from the South African government, and that there was no expression of Native opinion at all.

The Mandates Commission expressed the unanimous opinion that a complete and authoritative enquiry had not taken place and that only one party had been heard. This was some irony – Hofmeyr had earlier complained that in respect of the SA Commission Report his rights to be heard on one specific matter had not been respected (without thought that the Native side had been insufficiently represented on all matters).

The Mandates Commission dragged forth a detailed portrait of the whole of the territory's Native policy. All of it came out: the pass laws, the Dog Tax, the white settlers' steady encroachment on African land, the lack of schools, the avidity with which white farmers hung around magistrates' offices hoping to pick up convict labour, and "the general feeling of the ignorant farmers ... that the Natives were there chiefly as labourers for [the white farmers]".

Major Herbst said that Hofmeyr had consistently resisted pressure from white farmers to give wider powers like flogging to local officials, and had tried to improve black-white relations in South West Africa.

In relation to the Bondelswarts, Major Herbst asserted that Hofmeyr had done what nine out of ten administrators would have done in similar circumstances, and argued that the Mandates Commission should see the issue as one not of pre-existing native grievances and a just rebellion harshly crushed, but as the breach of law by the Bondelswarts. Herbst did not reflect that if this assertion were true, the use of military force against citizens breaching the law could hardly be justified.

In relation to the use of aeroplanes, Major Herbst was asked "did you ask for aeroplanes with a view to intimidating the Bondelswarts rather than actually in order to bomb them?" Seemingly unaware of the way out offered by the question, Major Herbst replied that "the idea was to surround [the Bondelswarts] with troops and then to bomb them and induce them to surrender. We were afraid they would follow the same tactics as they did against the Germans and proceed to the mouth of the Orange River, where they would send out raiding parties to collect arms, and keep up a guerrilla warfare for a long time.

As further justification, Major Herbst (correctly) reminded the Mandates Commission that Britain was bombing tribesmen in Iraq as well.

Major Herbst went on to tell the Mandates Commission that it would have serious consequences if they condemned Hofmeyr "except with the clearest and most undoubted evidence".

Herbst continued: "What would be the effect on an Administrator of such a censure coming from a body like the Mandates Commission? Could he possibly, with any self-respect, continue in occupation of the post?"

Herbst said that if Hofmeyr were forced to resign this would result in white reaction in South West Africa, for they, Herbst said, already felt that the Government in South West Africa was "far too liberal".

Herbst concluded by saying that since there was no standing army to speak of in South West Africa, and since the white population was far outnumbered by the Blacks, the Government had to act swiftly in the event of trouble to prevent a catastrophe developing. The law had to be immediately and forcefully vindicated to keep control.

Lewis comments that it is not unreasonable to conclude that this unsubtle but frank appeal to the mercy of the Mandates Commission may have had a restraining influence on the authors of the final Mandates Commission Report.

=== At loggerheads with Colonel Creswell (August 1923) ===
After Colonel Creswell criticised Hofmeyr in parliament over the Bondelswarts affair, Hofmeyr wrote to Creswell in early June 1923.

Hofmeyr's first complaint was that the Commission of Enquiry did not allow him adequate opportunity to comment on their findings. "The Jingo Press, which I notice is still snarling at me as a blind to cover up its tracks of racial bias, made most serious charges against me a year ago. As a result, a Commission was deputed by the Government to investigate the whole matter. In my reply to the findings of the majority of the Commission, I stated as clearly as language can convey that I was condemned unheard...

"The evidence of several of my officials was not supplied to them for revision...the evidence... especially of the Hottentots was not tested by cross-examination ... I was never informed of the tenor of the evidence thus taken or afforded an opportunity of controverting or answering same. I was virtually tried and condemned in my absence. What a travesty of the essential principles of justice, to say nothing of the oft-flaunted principles of British justice."

Hofmeyr goes on to complain that Creswell attacked him under cover of parliamentary privilege (where a politician cannot be sued for libel or defamation for words spoken in parliament). "I was condemned unheard and denied the privilege accorded the meanest felon in the land, you under cover of parliamentary privilege accused me and the brave and honourable men whom I had the honour of leading on such a hazardous expedition of shooting in cold blood defenceless prisoners".

Hofmeyr does not hold back. "Can you wonder at General Smuts' indignation and utter disgust that the House of Assembly and through it the country should have been so wantonly disgraced?"

"And what was to be the gain? Incidentally, a Dutchman's downfall, but in reality the miserable party advantage of the Native and coloured vote. The Bolshevist element among these politically deluded people you will perhaps gain or retain, but will the rational, solid, self-reliant and intelligent Native and Coloured voter walk into your parlour?"

Hofmeyr highlights the bravery of the Administration's forces who attacked the Bondelswarts (ignoring the fact that the Administration's military power was overwhelmingly superior to the Bondelswarts). "I searched the newspaper columns ... in vain for some recognition of the services of the men who went into the field, humanly speaking, against tremendous odds, but from a conviction that under God's guidance it was their duty. I find not a single word of sympathy with those of the men who were maimed for life or even with the relatives of those who gave their lives."

Hofmeyr appeals for a retraction by Creswell on behalf of his armed forces. "Colonel, you can right the wrong. If you have so utterly lost faith in me as to consider me beyond the pale of fair play, let that remain your pleasure. But I would ask you to publicly withdraw what is felt as a foul and considered as a cowardly charge against the brave and chivalrous men who bravely and fearlessly carried out my orders and helped me to avert a pending catastrophe by crushing as quickly as possible a deliberate rebellion against constitutional authority; but to do so by fair and square fighting and the employment of humane methods." Hofmeyr omits to mention that at the time his description of the conflict was a "punitive expedition".

Hofmeyr finally appeals for a retraction on behalf of his own family members. "... one should not be too much surprised when hitting below the belt sometimes takes place in these days of inordinate irrationality in public life with consequent loss of perspective. I have tried to make due allowance for this and could silently bear it all but for the pain caused the members of one's family who fully realise the seriousness of charges made by one who speaks with the authority of an acknowledged leader and respected member of the House."

"Colonel, if you could see the letter I have received from my aged father of 88, from my children and relations, you would not only be able to gauge the depth of the wound you have inflicted, but you would see the bitter reproach against me for having steadfastly defended you as a clean politician and honourable gentleman".

The retraction Hofmeyr was eager for Colonel Creswell to issue to help prevent a "Dutchman's downfall" was never made.

=== Mandates Commission review of the Bondelswarts uprising ===
==== Mandates Commission Report (August 1923) ====
The Mandates Commission issued their report on the Bondelswarts uprising on 14 August 1923. The report was almost deliberately inconclusive, as though its members wished to evade a final judgement, commenting rather weakly that the Union Government had not provided them with an "official government report", and more properly that no one from the Bondelswart side was there to give evidence.

The Mandates Commission Report concluded that "the primary cause of the rising was mutual distrust, which existed between the whites and Blacks, and which was responsible for previous risings in South West Africa, where even the educated classes regarded the Natives as existing chiefly for the purpose of labour for the whites."

The Mandates Commission found, in the case of the Dog Tax, that the tax must have been "prohibitive" for Blacks, stating that "since these people, we are told, could not find money to pay the tax or fines, this meant that they had to work for the whites who, moreover, could not pay cash to their labourers".

The Report was particularly critical of the Vagrancy Law of 1920 under which a magistrate was authorised, in lieu of the punishment prescribed, to adjudge the accused Native to a term of service on public works or to employment under any municipality or private person other than the complainant, for a term not exceeding that for which imprisonment might be imposed, at such wages as the magistrate deemed fair. "This power of imposing forced labour for the benefit of private individuals in lieu of the sentence of the court is a practice which cannot be approved."

The Report found that "as regards the conduct of the military operations, it is not disputed that the Administrator, when it became evident that hostilities were inevitable, acted wisely in taking prompt and effective steps to uphold Government authority and to prevent the spread of disaffection."

But this apparent endorsement of Hofmeyr's actions was significantly qualified. The Report noted that the repression of the uprising "appears to have been carried out with excessive severity, and had it been preceded by a demonstration of the overwhelming force at the command of the military authority, an immediate and perhaps bloodless surrender might have been anticipated".

On the peace discussions, the Report found that the negotiations with the rebels had been mishandled and timely intervention by Hofmeyr would have prevented the rebellion.

Hofmeyr was condemned for personally conducting military operations as a civil servant and representative of the Mandatory power since it "excludes in the eyes of the natives the possibility of a supreme appeal to the highest authority, but also, as a consequence the Administrator is deprived of his capacity as an impartial critic and judge of the conduct of operations."

In an annex to the Report, the chairman, Marquess Theodoli of Italy, was blunt in his assessment. He argued that in accordance with the Covenant, the actions of administrators ought to be in line with the purpose of the Mandate system, namely the "well-being and development of less-advanced peoples."

Theodoli declared "my fundamental impression is that the Administration ... seems above all to have been concerned with maintaining its own authority in defence of the interests of the minority consisting of the white population... the Administration ought... from the beginning to have carried on a policy and adopted an administrative practice calculated to lessen the racial prejudice, which in those territories has always been the fundamental cause of the hostility which has invariably existed between the Native population and the whites."

Theodoli also stated that the "Administration has pursued a policy of force rather than of persuasion, and further that this policy has always been conceived and applied in the interests of the colonists rather than in the interests of the Natives."

==== Reaction to the Mandates Commission Report ====
Sir Edgar Walton (High Commissioner for South Africa in London, and one of the South African representatives in Geneva), attacked the findings of the Mandates Commission Report in a Memorandum sent to the Mandates Commission, saying that the commission had "failed altogether to realize the situation in South West Africa" and he pointed out the difficulties of administering a country in which post-war tensions and the overthrow of the old regime had made unrest prevalent among the Blacks.

Walton supported Hofmeyr, saying that Hofmeyr was "a man of the highest possible character, who is incapable of an act or wrong or injustice, a man of wide sympathy, and a man who certainly felt to the full his deep responsibility for the well-being of the native races placed under his hand".

Walton said that he believed that "it would not have been possible to appoint a man who would have more earnestly endeavoured to administer the country, or a man with a fuller conception of the task as a sacred trust of civilisation, but ... the maintenance of law and order is always an essential preliminary to the inculcation of the principles of civilisation."

Walton re-emphasised that Smuts had not dismissed Hofmeyr and that "the only possible course under the circumstances as they existed in the Territory was to deal with the trouble with the utmost promptitude".

Following circulation of the Mandates Commission Report, the Council of the League of Nations passed a resolution that, in diplomatic language, censored South Africa for its behaviour in the affair and expressed its hope that, in the future, South Africa would report improvement in the condition of the Bondelswarts. This might seem very little, but still the South African government protested the resolution.

The Cape Times, in an editorial on 26 September 1923, summed things up as follows: "Whatever we may think of some of the Mandate Commission's conclusions, we believe that enlightened public opinion in South Africa, even with its local knowledge of mitigating circumstances, has made up its mind that there was much in the handling of the Bondelswarts episode to justify serious doubts as to the wisdom of the Administrator in that crisis. Grave errors of judgement were made."

Hofmeyr felt that the Mandates Commission had shown itself susceptible to the "penetrating persistence of the inordinate irrationality of the present time". It is not clear what he really meant by this, other than he felt he had not been judged fairly.

Hofmeyr considered the Mandates Commission's judgement to be "hasty and immature" and said that he would do the same as he had done if the rebellion were to happen again.

==== Lennox Ward Report ====
Perhaps in an attempt to vindicate his actions, Hofmeyr commissioned a report by Lennox Ward, the Attorney General of South West Africa.

Ward said that on reading the SA Commission Report he found himself "in full accord with the findings arrived at by General Lemmer".

Ward defended the Dog Tax: "I am of the opinion that [the Bondelswarts] could have met the tax imposed if they had so desired, but that they deliberately restrained from doing so in a spirit of defiance, which characterised all their relations with the Administration."

Without citing any evidence, Ward went on to express the belief that the Bondelswarts revolt was deliberately conceived and engineered, that the Administration acted throughout with the greatest patience and forbearance, and that "but for the prompt and effective manner in which the rising was suppressed, the consequences ... might well have been disastrous".

The report might have made an impression had it been independent. However, Lennox Ward reported directly to Hofmeyr, and so few people paid much attention to the report and those that did were sceptical of its findings.

The Cape Argus was unimpressed, writing on 4 October 1923 that "the Administrator ... long ago vindicated himself against criticism in an official memorandum written in reply to the ... Commission on the Bondelswarts Rebellion ... but inasmuch as the Mandatory Commission and the League of Nations does not seem quite satisfied with this effort, we notice that someone – not surely Mr Hofmeyr himself – has caused to be published ... another long-winded vindication, this time from the pen of the Attorney-General of the territory".

==== Hofmeyr before the Mandates Commission (June 1924) ====
In 1924 South Africa were once again due to appear before the Mandates Commission in Geneva. It seems that some of the conclusions of the SA Commission Report and the Mandates Commission Report were finally taken to heart.

Hofmeyr, with encouragement from Smuts, decided to appear personally before the Mandates Commission to explain and defend his position.

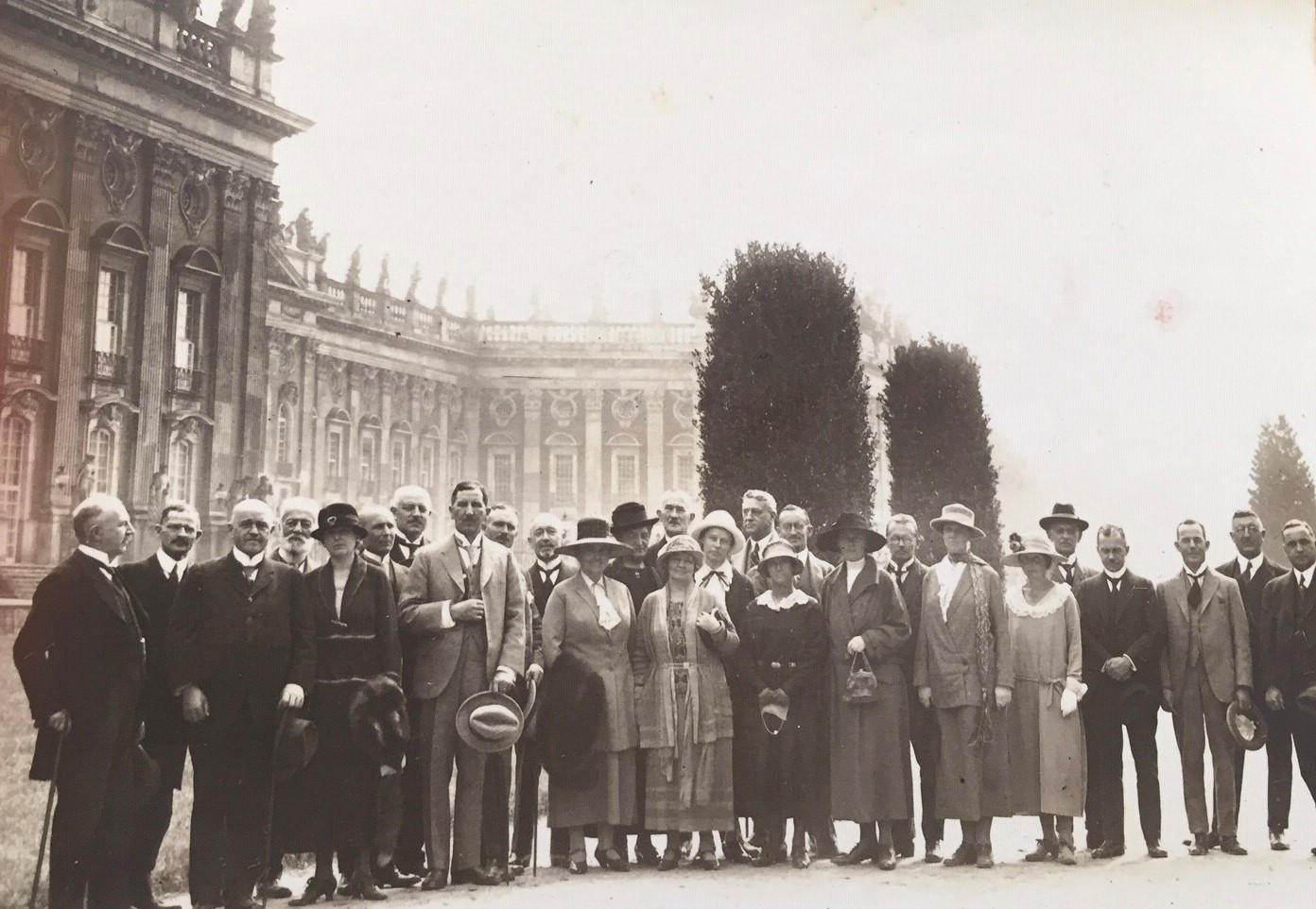
Hofmeyr at the Permanent Mandates Commission in Geneva, 1924. Hofmeyr is eighth from the left, his wife eleventh from the left.

Needing something positive to report, Hofmeyr ordered that Jacobus Christian and others be released early on 19 May 1924. Two days later, in line with long-standing requests from the Bondelswarts, Hofmeyr appointed Jacobus Christian as the leader of the Bondelswarts recognised by the Administration and agreed to pay him a salary for acting in that capacity.

The Mandates Commission devoted eight sessions to South West Africa on 26, 27, and 30 June, and 2 and 3 July. Hofmeyr and Major Manning, Secretary of the Department for Native Affairs, attended in person.

Hofmeyr reported the release of Jacobus Christian and others, the appointment of Jacobus Christian as "Kaptein" of the Bondelswarts, the restoration of the Reserve to the tribe and the return of all the stock captured after the conflict; the offer of work to the able-bodied and the provision of rations and free medical assistance to paupers. Hofmeyr reported that mission stations and schools were being encouraged and a new, more suitable Reserve super-intendant had been appointed.

Hofmeyr impressed by being well-prepared, bringing several maps and a couple of photograph albums. The Mandates Commission were charmed by Hofmeyr's courtesy – when the commission complained about the brevity of the Annual Report, Hofmeyr disarmingly replied that his government had instructed him to keep it short so as not to waste the commission's time.

The Mandates Commission were fulsome in their praise: "The Commission wishes to express its gratitude ... [and] to bring to the notice of the Council ... the exceptional assistance which [Hofmeyr] afforded to the Commission in his quality as Administrator of SWA. The presence during its discussions of those who are personally responsible for the actual administration of the Mandated territories present ... eminent advantages. Thanks to the exact information which Mr Hofmeyr was able to supply as a result of his thorough knowledge of the problems of administration, and his personal experience, the Commission was able to obtain a far more exact idea of the position in South West Africa than was possible from the examination of previous reports."

The Commission expressed the hope that in future other administrators would also appear in person.

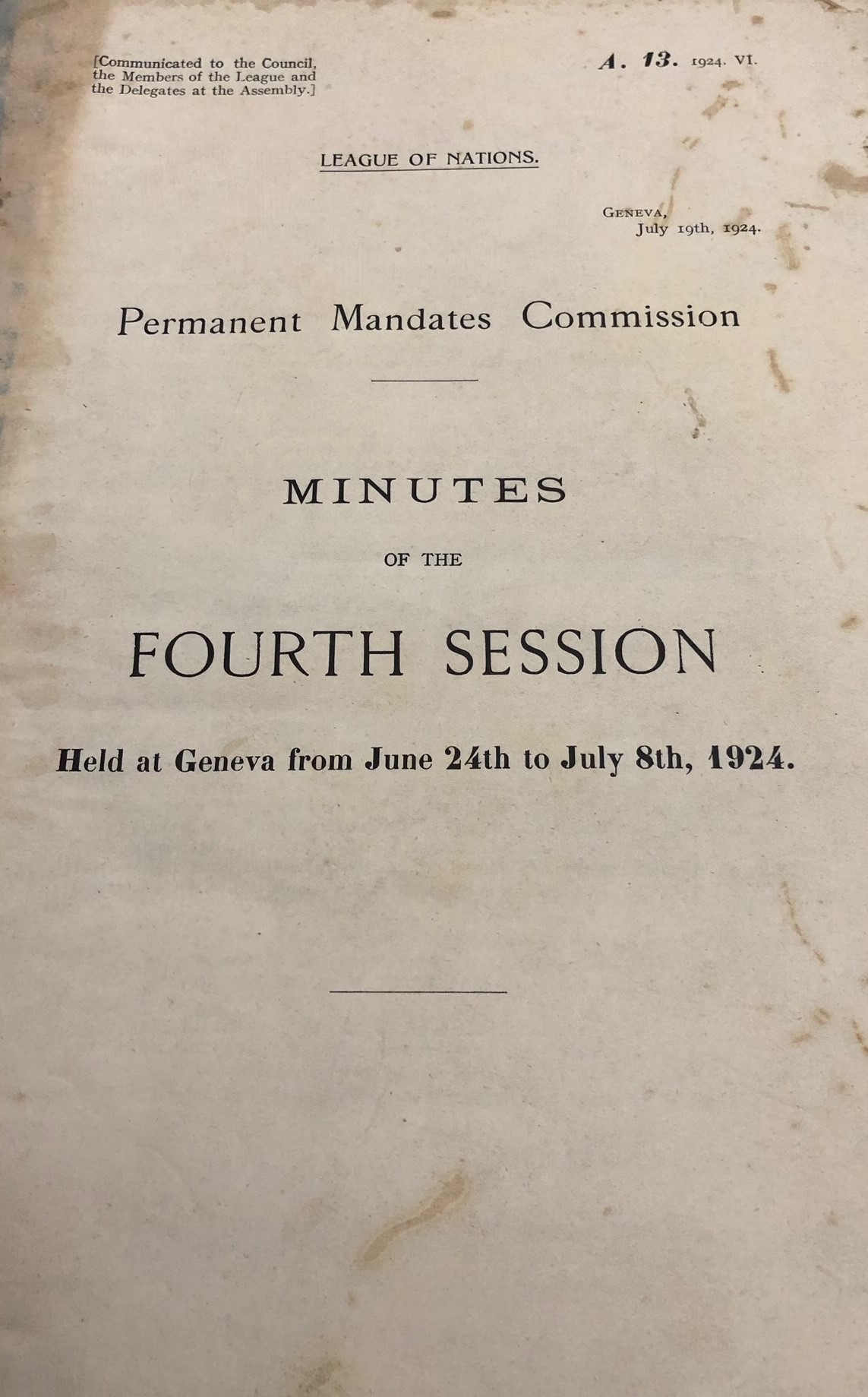
1924 League of Nations Permanent Mandates Commission Minutes of the Fourth Session held at Geneva 24 June to 8 July 1924

The Mandates Commission was sympathetic in relation to Hofmeyr's position on the Reserves. "The Commission desires first of all to express once again its great appreciation of the opportunity of hearing the views of the Administrator for South West Africa. His authoritative statements have been of the greatest assistance in throwing light on the various administrative questions which arise in a territory where the co-existence of a Native population and large domiciled European community creates conditions and raises problems which are found in no other African territory under Mandate. These statements have also drawn attention to the fact that, under the previous administration, vast agricultural lands were granted to European colonists whose rights and titles it would be difficult not to recognise."

"The Commission ... fully understands the reasons which may have prompted this policy of protecting the Natives, by establishing Reserves, from influences subversive of the maintenance of their customs and traditions". It is not clear which "subversive" influences the Mandates Commission fears.

However, gentle and diplomatic as it had been, the Mandates Commission also admonished Hofmeyr: "[the Mandates Commission] would however, point out, that under Article 22 ... the Mandatory Power is entrusted with a civilising mission which it obviously cannot carry out if the Natives, being segregated into Reserves, are completely isolated and left to their own devices... It trusts that the next reports will include ... the efforts, both to promote the evolution of a less rudimentary civilisation among the Natives within their Reserves and to facilitate the movement of those desirous of seeking employment outside their Reserves. ... in particular the Commission will follow with interest the steps taken .... to increase the number of schools ... and develop industrious habits among the Natives."

The Mandates Commission stated that while Reserves were acceptable in principle "... there is no doubt that in the future the Administration will have at its disposal sufficient fertile land for the growing needs of the Native population and that the Reserves will be enlarged in proportion to the progressive increase of the population". There is no evidence that Hofmeyr misled the Mandates Commission in relation to future disposable fertile land and it seems that the Mandates Commission was either wanting to nudge him in that direction or happy to indulge in wishful thinking.

The Mandates Commission gently applied pressure on Hofmeyr. "The Mandatory power will furnish the [Mandates Commission] with specimen labour contracts in use for the mines and also with the regulations regarding the conditions of labourers in the compounds... The [Mandates Commission] was struck by the statistics regarding the mortality of workers in the diamond mines... it is particularly anxious to know the exact number and the causes of these deaths".

On segregation the Mandates Commission was most forgiving. "In view of the fact that the territory contains racial elements which the Administration does not regard as Native, but which are not purely immigrant, the [Mandates Commission] would be glad to know the exact meaning of the terms "Native" and "Coloured person" ... [and] to learn the policy followed ... in regard to the various classes of persons of mixed race living in the territory".

After all the criticism, Hofmeyr basked in the Mandates Commission's encouragement and very light admonishment. Addressing the Mandates Commission, Hofmeyr said: "This is a wonderful gathering... the spirit present here, the spirit of goodwill, the spirit of solicitation of the view point of others, the spirit of forbearance which greets the humblest speaker, like myself, with the same heartiness as it does the most eloquent and sagacious – this spirit constitutes the dynamic force which is going to lead the world triumphantly back from chaos and darkness to paths of virtue, order and light".

Hofmeyr continued. "I hold that the existence and continuance of the League are absolutely essential if we are to reach the goal where disputes between nations will eventually be settled by international courts of arbitration ... instead of by the barbaric method of the arbitrament of the sword." Hofmeyr seems to be referring to the hope that advanced nations will not have another conflict like World War I, rather than reflecting on the actions of his Administration in relation to the Bondelswart rebellion.

Following the Mandates Commission meetings, Hofmeyr reports to Smuts, satisfied that all is well. Writing in Dutch, Hofmeyr says that although no decision has yet been made by the Mandates Commission he expects the outcome to be favourable.

=== General election in South Africa (June 1924) ===
Just as the wheel of fortune seemed to be turning in Hofmeyr's favour by the relatively warm reception he received at the Mandates Commission in Geneva, in the South African general election of June 1924 J.B.M. Hertzog's Nationalists, together with Colonel Creswell's Labour Party, defeated Smuts' South African Party.

Hertzog replaced Smuts as prime minister and Hofmeyr immediately recognised that Hertzog may want to replace him as Administrator. Hofmeyr wrote to Smuts that when Hofmeyr was back in Pretoria "ons die wenslikheid bespreek of ik my tyd sal uitdien in SWA al dan niet" (we can discuss the desirability of whether I will serve out my time in South West Africa or not). Hofmeyr's time as Administrator was surely limited.

=== Empire Parliamentary Association in Westminster (July 1924) ===
A few weeks after Hofmeyr's appearance in Geneva before the Mandates Commission Hofmeyr gave an address to the Informal Conference held by the Empire Parliamentary Association at Westminster Hall in London.

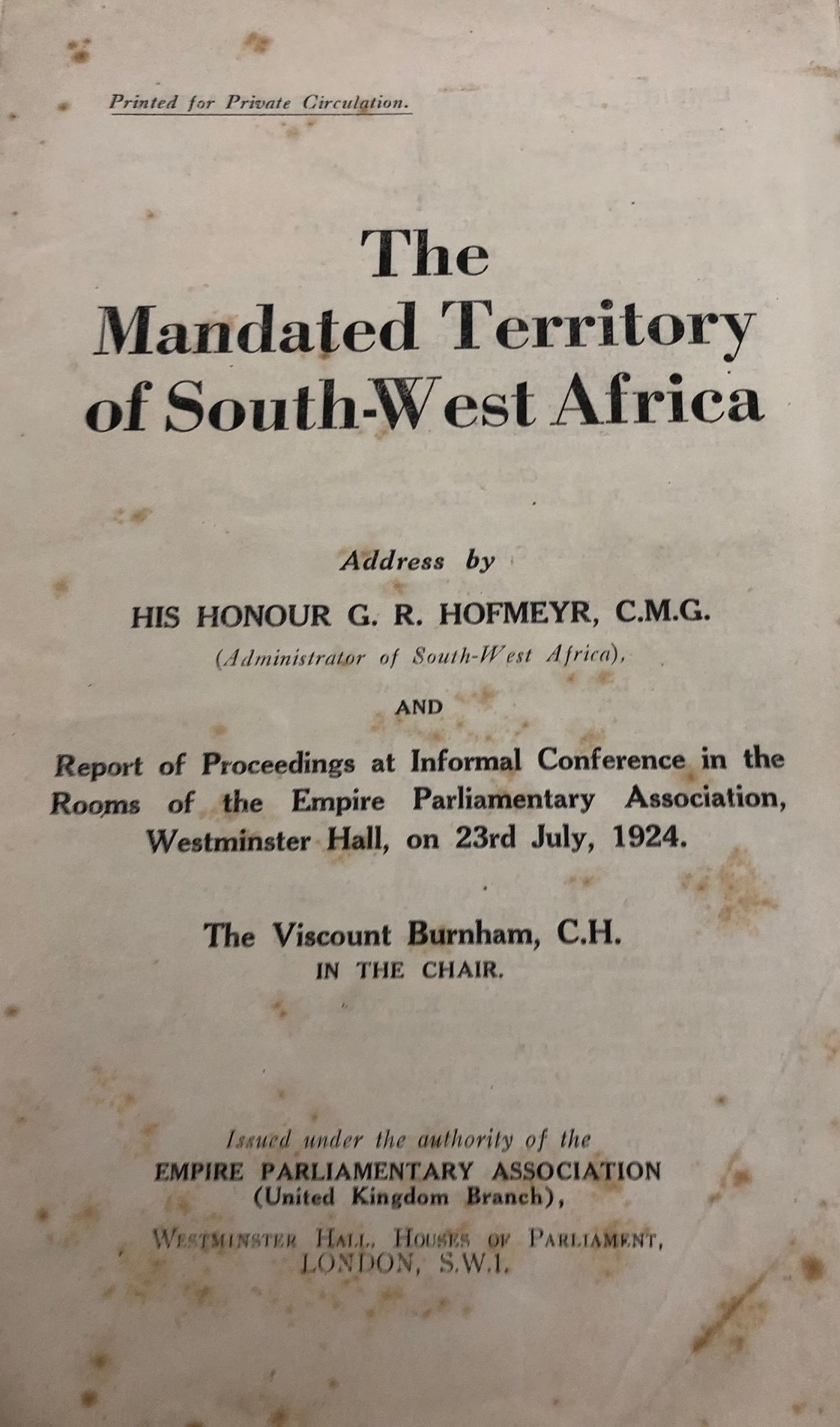
1924 Report of Proceedings at Informal Conference of the Empire Parliamentary Association 23 July 1924

Hofmeyr felt he was among like-minded folk and was sufficiently at ease to describe the Natives as follows: "The Natives, who differ vastly in mentality, are in varying backward stages of civilisation, and the mere mention of the number of different tribes will indicate what a difficult Native and Coloured problem we have side by side with a complex question of whites".

Nonetheless the chance to improve his reputation could not be missed. Hofmeyr cited improvements he had made to the conditions for Natives: "The Natives... were not allowed to own large stock before we came into the country... we have reversed that policy and [Natives] at present own 79,000 head of large stock, over 2,000 horses, 6,500 donkeys and over 700,000 head of small stock..."

"I would naturally like to speak to you about [the Bondelswarts]. "You are interested, no doubt, in the difficulties that we have had with that tribe". "They are warlike and independent, and they have very little or no respect for a European. They have so long been masters in their own home there that naturally it is very difficult for them to conform to the European rule. They are by nature averse to labour... Jacobus Christian, Chief of the tribe, with the other two leaders were released by me a couple of months ago."

Hofmeyr avoided difficult points: "I do not want to trouble you with details in connection with the operations during the rebellion". However, there is an element of contrition: "I will content myself to say that when Jacobus Christian defied the authorities in 1919 our Administration followed a wrong course, and the fruits were left to me to reap". Hofmeyr's admission of a "wrong course" is not an acceptance of personal blame (he was not Administrator in 1919), but he may be trying to indicate obliquely that he is sorry.

Hofmeyr then quoted Attorney-General Lennox Ward's exoneration of his conduct: "The Administration acted... throughout with the greatest patience and forbearance in the face, in certain instances, of open insolence. The conflict was... deliberately sought and inevitable, and but for the prompt and effective suppression, the consequences to the country may well have been disastrous."

Hofmeyr quoted Lennox Ward's comment that in relation to the official South African Commission of enquiry Lennox Ward rejected the majority view which was critical of the Administration's actions but supported the findings of General Lemmer (which were favourable to Hofmeyr).

Hofmeyr described Lennox Ward as someone who "... had nothing whatever to do with the insurrection, who knew nothing of its inception, and had nothing to do with its suppression." Hofmeyr neglected to mention the critical fact that Ward reported to Hofmeyr, and so could not be regarded as independent. Hofmeyr nonetheless tried to reassure his audience by stating that Lennox Ward is "a gentleman of the highest integrity... a trained and experienced gentleman who takes a judicial view of the whole position calmly on the facts as he found them on the evidence produced in Court".

Hofmeyr read out a letter from the Bondelswarts leader Jacobus Christian (which he translated from "very crude Dutch"): "Words fail me to express the gratitude I feel in my heart towards His Majesty the King for what he has done for us" – which include Jacobus Christian's release from prison and appointment as headman of the Bondelswarts.

Christian had slipped in the following: "We are all so pleased that we can jump for joy, but I wish to ask Your Honour one favour, and that is that when we return to our people... we may also have something to give to our families, because they have become greatly impoverished during our sojourn in jail."

Hofmeyr presented little self-doubt. "I had known Natives and grown up with them, and I say it was absolutely impossible for us to avoid this conflict, which I make bold to say it was impossible to prevent, even by an angel from Heaven. I dealt with it personally throughout."

Sensitive to the criticism of the Mandates Commission that he should have negotiated with the Bondelswarts in person before launching the punitive expedition, Hofmeyr referenced his own bravery: "Prior to this, every six months or so there was a rumour of a pending Native rising right throughout the country... and it was extremely difficult to get people to come into the country, which otherwise held considerable promise for the settler. On those occasions... to remove that anxiety, I used to take a trip out in the direction where the greatest danger was threatened, with only my secretary and quite unarmed. ... I did this in order to induce the people to return to their farms, to reassure them, and, at the same time, incidentally it served to secure for me the respect and confidence of the Natives themselves."

Hoping to deflect the criticism levied by the Mandates Commission, Hofmeyr reminded the audience that he invited Jacobus Christian to meet four times – "but Christian had flatly refused to do so, and we had to use force. Since that time there has been no recurrence of rumours of Native risings..."

Hofmeyr remained on the defensive. "Everything is being done to improve the position of the Bondelswarts, and several schools have been opened in their Reserve."

The opportunity of sanitising the Dog Tax, which had been a significant trigger for the Bondelswarts punitive expedition, was irresistible. "I am quite sincere when I say that I only applied the Dog Tax, which was already in force in urban areas, to the rural areas with the deliberate object of trying to prevent the ruthless destruction of game and eliminate this means of livelihood for the class of person – Black and White".

To legitimise this he mentions the Trekboers, saying "they are pretty useless, but generally have very large families and give much trouble", before recounting a story of one who had 13 dogs and boasting that two of them could catch a gemsbok "in two jiffies". Hofmeyr goes on: "I came to the conclusion that this class of white man was as objectionable as the vagrant Native..."

Hofmeyr was enjoying being able to present his version of events to a friendly audience. "I put [the Natives], in every case, into these Reserves with their consent. No force has been used in this direction, with the result that I can claim that I have the full confidence of the Natives today in South-West Africa, including the Bondelswarts, and generally speaking the Natives are loyal and contented". This is not consistent with the documentary records.

Hofmeyr was proud of the help given to white settlers: "After a farm is allotted ... [the white settler] can farm for three years without paying a brass bean... within the first five years he can exercise the option of purchase; then ... he can pay in instalments ranging over a period of 20 years.

Asked about capital required by white settlers, Hofmeyr answers: "he can do with capital of £250. We give him up to £400 for a house, and up to £750 to buy stock ... we give him money for a windmill, a borehole for improving his land, and so forth." No such assistance was given to any Natives. Hofmeyr feels no need to mention this, and no one in the audience questions him on this.

Buxton, who had been Governor-General of South Africa from 1914 to 1920, gave a vote of thanks, and revealed views that were not dissimilar to those of Hofmeyr. "You have seldom a place in which you have such a difficult Native population... you have a mixture ... of the least intelligent and the least developed of all the Native tribes. Not only so, but they have had, unfortunately for themselves, some 20 or 30 years of German rule, and that has tended, to put it mildly, to demoralise them... in addition... what makes it still more complicated and more difficult is that, though it is an integral part of the Union, under the Treaty of Versailles [South West Africa] is a Mandated Territory, and therefore the League of Nations are perfectly entitled to keep under observation what is done there and to criticise, if necessary, any action that may have been taken."

Buxton went on: "I was informed by one of our British delegates... that [Hofmeyr] gave them the utmost satisfaction, and [the Mandates Commission] felt that as far as the British Empire was concerned the late German South-West Territory was being administered by the Union in the best possible way. I think that is a great tribute, not only of course, to Mr Hofmeyr himself, but to the method in which we desire that this Mandate should be carried out."

After Buxton's vote of thanks, Hofmeyr gave a brief reply, firmly aligning himself as a member of the British imperial network: "I just say how much I appreciate your encouragement... We are carrying out the traditions of the old mother country. I have already said that just as you are jealous of the integrity, of the prestige, of the honour of that larger household that forms our great family, so are we imbued with the idea of contributing something ... that will lift the honour of the Empire to which we belong to the highest possible plane... that has been our object out there, and if we have failed in certain respects it is because of the limitations of human nature; it is not because of any lack of sincere desire to promote our common aim." Hofmeyr does not accept personal blame, rather pointing to the general "limitations of human nature".

=== Letter to Smuts (December 1924) ===
In December 1924, although Smuts was no longer prime minister, Hofmeyr wrote to Smuts suggesting a three-way meeting to discuss policy for South West Africa. "I know it has always been your set policy not to draw South West Africa into the political arena of the Union... I am inclined to think that General Hertzog will also wish to treat South West Africa on a non-political basis and I would suggest a conference between him and yourself as soon as Parliament meets."

Hofmeyr lamented the continuing divisions between the British and the Germans. "The two sections of the [white] population hold diametrically opposed views as to the future destiny of the Territory and they cordially distrust each other... every German who has tried to co-operate with us... is promptly boycotted by his fellow Germans... and complains bitterly in private of their unenviable position." Hofmeyr's solution was to increase the non-German Europeans: "... I have tried [to apply] a counter-weight by the settlement as fast as possible of Union people on the land".

Hofmeyr was happy with his own performance. "I am convinced we have steered the right middle course... the extremists among the Union section are dissatisfied... the extremists among the German section are dissatisfied ... the Natives, whose treatment the authorities of the League of Nations have admitted to be fair and equitable, are also dissatisfied, thus proving that we are gradually but effectively tightening up necessary control."

"I am indebted to you for insisting on my going to Geneva. I think I was able to render substantial public service both at the League offices and in England, while to me the experience was absorbingly interesting.... One thing of great importance to us ... is the imperative necessity of being adequately represented at the Assembly meetings of the League."

Although the long letter comprised a series of justifications of Hofmeyr's actions as Administrator, towards the end Hofmeyr told Smuts that when Hertzog asked him to remain after the expiration of his term of office that he could not do so, assigning no reasons beyond assuring Hertzog that it was not due to the change of government. Hofmeyr told Smuts that Hertzog approved of the policy followed and had said that Hofmeyr could "with a clear conscience continue in office in the best interests of the Territory".

Hofmeyr's position on continuing as Administrator would change as he later tried harder and harder to convince Hertzog to keep him in post.

=== Rehoboth uprising (1925) ===
In 1924 at Geneva, attending sittings of the Mandates Commission unrelated to South West Africa, Hofmeyr paid tribute to the work of the Mandates Commission, commenting: "The [Mandates Commission] is the child of the Great War... We took part in that and many of us have made substantial sacrifices. This morning my mind went over the extent of that war and the state of Europe today. We in South Africa have sometimes felt despondent. We have sometimes wondered whether this great institution, to which the eyes of mankind have turned for light and guidance... will be a success and will help us out. As a result of what I have seen here, I am filled with a new hope. A new avenue seems to be revealed by which we may escape from our old habits."

Wellington wonders what Hofmeyr meant by "our old habits". "Was he thinking of riding roughshod over the feelings of the Africans? It may have been so because the next clash with the non-whites, the Rehoboth uprising, was handled very differently by Hofmeyr. The Administration knew that its actions would be scrutinized closely by the world body".

In 1915 the Rehoboth Basters believed that General Botha, leader of the invading South African army, had promised that their complete independence would be respected. Like the Bondelswarts in 1922, the Rehobothers wanted independence from the Administration. They sent a batch of petitions to Lloyd George and to Smuts asking that they be permitted to retain their status as "an independent people under the Union Jack".

In 1923 an agreement was drawn up between Hofmeyr and a group of Basters in which the Basters were to be granted limited self-government. This upset the majority of Basters who wanted complete independence.

The proposed limited self-government agreement for the Rehoboth Basters was rejected by 74 percent of the voters in a referendum in Rehoboth on 9 August 1923. Nevertheless, the Rehoboth Council went ahead and signed the treaty with Hofmeyr on 17 August 1923.

Members of the Rehoboth community opposed to the treaty elected an alternative Peoples Council headed by Nicolaas van Wijk on 23 April 1924, and the Peoples Council declared the independence of Rehoboth on 1 December 1924 and proclaimed a republic.

This alternative People's council appealed to the Mandates Commission for independence. On the Mandates Commission Lord Lugard observed that the grant of complete independence to a particular people would be incompatible with the Mandate, but a large measure of independence could certainly be given. Hofmeyr replied that the Rehobothers were not qualified for this. The Mandates Commission denied the Rehoboth Basters any further remedy.

A prolonged and rancorous dispute ensued. Hofmeyr recognised that the new council was by far the more representative, but nevertheless declared its election void. Fresh elections were proclaimed, but the new council refused to participate. The old council was altogether powerless. The new council represented the majority but continued to be snubbed by the Administration. After a year of deadlock, Hofmeyr suspended the 1923 agreement and transferred by proclamation the powers of the council to a magistrate and demanded as a token of submission that the community observe the Administration's cattle-branding regulations.

An invitation by Hofmeyr to both councils to meet him was treated with contempt as each side wanted nothing to do with the other. The situation deteriorated and the leader of the new council did not brand his cattle in line with the Administration's regulations. When the police summonsed him, all his followers demanded to be taken into custody as well. Hertzog, the South African prime minister, instructed that a message be delivered to the Basters warning them to obey the law, and that they would be "held responsible for every drop of blood which may be spilled.

In April 1925 about 400 Basters, many of them armed with rifles, together with around 200 Herero, assembled in Rehoboth and openly defied Hofmeyr. It seemed as if an armed revolt was on the point of breaking out.

Hofmeyr imposed martial law in Rehoboth and as the number of police was insufficient, the newly created Defence Force was called up. Learning from his previous mistakes, Hofmeyr did not on this occasion assume military command. The Basters were completely surprised by the rapid surrounding of Rehoboth village before daybreak and upon their refusing to comply with an ultimatum to surrender, a block of buildings occupied by them was captured under cover of three warplanes that Hofmeyr had requested be dispatched by the Union Government to Rehoboth. A complete surrender followed and there was no bloodshed.

The bombing of the Bondelswarts must have been fresh in the minds of the Basters and the presence of the aeroplanes must have contributed largely to their surrender.

Some 406 Rehobothers were speedily tried in Windhoek on 7, 8 and 9 April 1925, resulting in prison sentences for 319 of the individuals. All were released from jail on 4 May 1925.

Wellington points out that it appears that Hofmeyr had accepted the Mandates Commission suggestion in the Bondelswarts affair, of a show of overwhelming force before launching an attack on rebels, and in this case the demonstration succeeded. Whatever mistakes Hofmeyr may have made on other occasions in their dealing with Natives, it is generally agreed that with the Rehobothers every possible method that patience and forbearance could suggest was tried before the strong hand of authority was shown.

The Union government decided that as the Rehoboth community had out of a total area of 1,795,000 hectares already lost 451,700 hectares of land to Europeans, the entry and residence of Europeans in the Rehoboth territory should be under the strict control of the Administrator, and that the acquisition, without the consent of the Administrator, of any interest in immovable property by persons other than Rehobothers be prohibited.

With the suppression of the Rehoboth rebellion, popular resistance and unity collapsed, and South West Africa entered a new phase of its history – for the next twenty years resistance was not completely absent, but it assumed much more muted forms and lacked the coherence and unity that had been displayed during the first five years of the Mandate.

=== Orumbo bombings (1925) ===
However, some of the "old habits" were hard for Hofmeyr to relinquish.

Following the suppression of the Rehoboth rising, Hofmeyr pressed the Union government to allow further "bombing demonstrations" in selected areas throughout the territory including Ovamboland. At first the proposal was vetoed by the South African Minister of Defence, probably because of the international outcry that followed the bombing of the Bondelswarts in 1922, but Hofmeyr continued to insist on the importance of these "demonstrations" and permission was finally granted in 1925.

In the east, the Herero and Mbanderu leaders (including Chief Hosea Kutako) had initially been prepared to support a move to new Reserves from better-watered but less secure land in central Namibia. Yet their hopes were disappointed as the harsh economic realities of these eastern semi-desert areas became clear: in 1924 they discovered that the area was not at Epukiro, but 30 km beyond it, on land described by Chief Kutako as "a desert where no human being ever lived before". Chief Kutako now opposed the removal.

The Administration in 1925 used a show of force to convince the Herero to move. Windmills and pumps were put out of action and huts were burned. Military aircraft dropped bombs into the hills to frighten people.

According to Hofmeyr, "argument and persuasion had no effect, and it was only after they realised that they would be forcibly expelled that they left".

This was in stark contrast to Hofmeyr's earlier promises made in Geneva in 1924 that "I put [the Natives], in every case, into these Reserves with their consent. No force has been used in this direction... and generally speaking the Natives are loyal and contented".

=== State controls ===
While the legal framework of state control was put in place by Hofmeyr during the 1920s, the practical means of enforcing it were not.

In 1923, the police numbered only 503 in total (278 whites and 225 Africans). Accordingly, the Administration had to use its military superiority to crush all resistance, and preserve the huge racial inequalities in land, wealth and rights that had been established during the German period.

In particular, the use of warplanes both to destroy and to threaten destruction changed the whole complexion of resistance in the territory and provided a powerful symbol of colonial supremacy with which to intimidate the colonised.

=== End of tenure as Administrator ===
Despite earlier having told Smuts and Hertzog that he would not continue as Administrator when his initial term ended, as the end date drew near Hofmeyr changed his mind. In November 1925, Hertzog advised Hofmeyr that Albertus Johannes Werth would succeed him from 1 April 1926, and invited Hofmeyr to be present at the handover to Werth, likely to take place in London. Hofmeyr tried to exert pressure on Hertzog to extend his appointment. On 30 November 1925 Hertzog's office wrote to JC Minnaar of Stampriet, Gibeon, in South West Africa, saying that Minnaar's letter and other petitioners asking for Hofmeyr's tenure as Administrator to be extended has received "serious attention" from the Prime Minister. The letter stated that although Hertzog and the South African Government did not underestimate the skill of Hofmeyr as Administrator, nonetheless they wanted to appoint a new Administrator "en sodoende sou die misverstand en oneenigheid van die verlede nie strek tot die nuwe regime nie" (and thus the misunderstanding and disagreement of the past would not extend to the new regime).

The issue became public. In November 1925 the Rand Daily Mail reported that "in the course of a short interview with Mr Oswald Pirow, who ... took a prominent part in the drafting of the new South-West Constitution, Mr Pirow said "I can only describe Mr Hofmeyr's claim that it is the wish of the majority of the inhabitants that he should remain as Administrator as an unparalleled exaggeration. I am prepared to state that not one per cent of the population desire to retain him. If the Government want to make the new constitution unworkable from the start, then the right way to do so will be to re-appoint Mr Hofmeyr." Nonetheless, on 19 December 1925 Hofmeyr wrote to Hertzog, saying that he received the notice that on 31 March 1926 he must resign as Administrator "met diepe teleurstelling" (with great disappointment). Hofmeyr's last day in office was 31 March 1926.

== Semi-retirement (1926) ==
Hofmeyr retired on a state pension in 1926 at the age of 55 but continued to be active in politics. He became director of several companies.

In May 1926, Hofmeyr was informed by Colonel Sir William Hoy, General Manager of the South African Railways & Harbours that the wharf at Walvis Bay was to be named the "Hofmeyr Wharf" in his honour.

In the same month Hofmeyr was appointed by Lord Athlone, then High Commissioner for South Africa, to serve on the commission to represent the government of the Union of South Africa in negotiations with Portugal with regard to negotiating the utilisation of the waters of the Cunene River for hydraulic power and irrigation following a final agreement being arrived at for the delimitation of the boundary between Angola and South West Africa.

== Later political thought ==
=== Reconciliation of the white races ===
In July 1926 Hofmeyr continued to push his earlier "reconciliation" views and issued public appeals for Hertzog and Smuts to merge their parties. Hofmeyr asserted that the time had come to rebuild Afrikaner unity, although how this was to be done he did not explain. Neither Smuts nor Hertzog took immediate action on his appeals. Nonetheless, Smuts reported later the same year that there was still a great deal of "hereniging" (reunion) talk about.

At this time Hofmeyr's nephew, JH Hofmeyr was rising to prominence. He was an infant prodigy, an Oxford phenomenon, a professor at 22, and in 1924, aged 30, had been appointed by Smuts as Administrator of the Transvaal. In 1928 the younger Hofmeyr also broadcast an appeal to both Smuts' South African Party and Hertzog's National Party to wind themselves up and join their forces in a great new party. The new appeal for reunion was as high-minded and imprecise as the elder Hofmeyr's appeal had been, but it created more stir.

The incident indicated a passing of the baton from one generation of Hofmeyrs to the next.

=== A new world spirit ===
In 1928 Hofmeyr presented himself as a strong supporter of the ideals of the League of Nations and published a political thought piece in The Cape Times: "A definite turn for good was taken after the Great War, which has proved to be the most hideous expression the world has ever known of its old-world doctrine of force. As the result of gazing upon the dark havoc wrought by that terrible experiment in a spirit of earnest search for light, there stands revealed the new-world doctrine of peace and goodwill as embodied in the League of Nations."

As said by Hofmeyr, "Our thoughts inevitably travel to Geneva – the Nazareth of the new world. There we find an institution both unique and wonderful with a prevailing spirit which is still more wonderful and still more unique...."

"Anyone who takes part in the work of the Assembly of the League, as I was privileged to do in 1924, finds his imagination gripped by the spirit which governs Geneva. I found there a readiness, if not an eagerness, on the part of the representatives of Nations, to generously tolerate each other's views, to approve the sincerity of each other's motives, to appreciate each other's actions, even if they cannot always be approved, to welcome every effort towards the attainment of the common aim of improving the conditions of life for mankind and of security the peace of the world".

"That spirit, sympathetic observers prayerfully hope, will ultimately permeate the civilised world including our South Africa, where, in spite of enormous potential wealth, our natural, normal, rational growth is impeded by the presence of a tenacious lingering racial atmosphere among the main elements of our European population which God has ordained shall become one united people."

It did not occur to Hofmeyr that all races in South Africa, and not only the "European" races" could become one united people. The principles and language are almost there, but the breakthrough never came.

"Happily, in South Africa there is a new tendency at last. By fostering this growing spirit of peace, racial co-operation and goodwill, we would not only promote racial unity, but we would create the best atmosphere for dealing with the great problems which still confront us... until quite naturally a united white people will emerge from sectional narrowness and pass to a truly united outlook"

Hofmeyr saw South Africa continuing as part of the British empire. "Our destiny, as part of the British Commonwealth of Nations, is now no longer seriously in dispute and we may regard it as settled..."

"This inter-Dominion relationship which enables us to operate with complete freedom as an independent unit ... within a group seems to me to be much the same the status conferred on man and wife by holy matrimony. Our marriage with England and other Dominions has by common consent and with appropriate formality, been entered in the Commonwealth register..." The polygamy metaphor may be clumsy – but the overall intended meaning is clear.

Hofmeyr again appealed to the nationalists to join the wider British family. "Accentuated by the Great Trek... the more the Dutch struggled to get away from the English the more persistent and importunate the latter became in their courtship until after the Anglo-Boer War – the necessity for which we all regret – both elements were forced to surrender to the will of providence which had ordained one destiny for us."

Hofmeyr was carried away by his vision. "Let us so equip ourselves in this new atmosphere that we may be enabled to spend 1928 clinging to the mountain-tops whence we can be heartened and encouraged by the prospect of ultimately attaining the ideal of a complete fusion of the two races".

Inspiring words. How much more inspiring would they have been had they included all races in South Africa?

=== The "Native problem" revisited ===
Hofmeyr continued to grapple with the "Native Problem". Ultimately, he could not reconcile the fact that his liberalism and his Christian values would result in Black majority rule; his instinct was that the whites should be running the country. He tried to find a middle path without success.

In 1928 Hofmeyr wrote that the "urgent necessity for assessing this intricate and important problem will, I take it, be readily conceded... my intense anxiety about a problem which is fraught with so much good or ill for the future"

Hofmeyr first describes the two extremes. "The two most widely divergent schools of thought on this question... are those who go all out for ultimate perfect equality with the white man and those who wish to keep the Native down by denying him all opportunity for developing to a higher status."

Hofmeyr wondered "whether it is possible to bridge or reconcile the two extremes by finding some middle course satisfactory to both and to the Native."

"The question is one of great delicacy and difficulty and should be approached in a rational and liberal spirit as after all at the bottom of it lies the deeper consideration of human right and human wrong".

For him, the qualified Cape franchise was all that the Natives could hope for. "The Natives justly look upon the Act of Union in which their political rights are entrenched and guaranteed as their Magna Carta and [Hertzog's] proposals involve an amendment of that Magna Carta in the direction of undermining and curtailing those rights".

In the end, notwithstanding his good intentions, Hofmeyr concludes that the only way forward is discrimination. "It must be frankly conceded that social equality cannot exist in the Union of South Africa. Discrimination in this respect is inevitable, but discrimination in other respects based mainly on colour must be approached with the utmost care and circumspection. If not, we may and probably shall sow the seeds for eternal struggle for supremacy".

Hofmeyr tried hard to apply liberal Christian principles to the "Native question" but ultimately his belief in the supremacy of the whites meant he was unable to do so.

== Standing for parliament: Riversdale (1929) ==
South Africa held a general election in June 1929. Hofmeyr was selected by Smuts' South African Party to stand for election in the Riversdale constitutency (where he had grown up).

In 1924 Riversdale had elected Mr AL Badenhorst, who represented Hertzog's Nationalist Party. Badenhorst was a farmer from around Riversdale and was not planning to give up his seat without a fight. Badenhorst repeatedly attacked Hofmeyr's record in South West Africa and this impacted negatively on Hofmeyr's prospects.

Such focus was not altogether surprising as the Bondelswarts rebellion had received a lot of attention. In addition, in the 1924 election, Hertzog and Creswell had successfully attacked the Smuts government as being violent, irresolute and incompetent. Hertzog had accused Smuts of being a man whose "footsteps dripped with blood".

In 1923, when Smuts returned from the Imperial Conference, the Rand Daily Mail pictured him flying to darkest Europe on angel's wings with the "lamp of common sense" in his hand; but a Labour cartoon parodied that picture: it gave him the angel's wings and put into his hand a top hat full of the flowers of brotherly love, but in the same sky it showed an aeroplane marked S.A.P. (South Africa Party, Smuts' party) dropping bombs on Johannesburg. The caption read "Smuts showering peace and goodwill on Europe but bombs and frightfulness on South Africa". The charge of hypocrisy rang true for many, and Hofmeyr suffered the same treatment.

Hofmeyr took great exception to Badenhorst's criticism. In March 1929, three months before the general election, Hofmeyr instituted legal action against Badenhorst, claiming £3,000 for damages for loss of good reputation.

Hofmeyr cited the following as false, malicious and defamatory words: "Mnr Hofmeyr sal julle allerhande leuens kom vertel. Die Mnr Hofmeyr is die man wat die bruinmense in Duits Wes laat dood skiet het, oor 'n geringe dingetije soos hondebelasting. Toe die arme mense nie hulle belasting kon betaal nie, toe het dieselfde Mnr Hofmeyr hulle laat dood skiet. Dit was glo omtrent 50 mans. Wat die Regering nie kon verstaan nie was dat daar was nie eers een wat gewes was nie, en toe die vrouwens en kinders van die mense in die rante of klowe ingevlug het, toe het Mnr Hofmeyr twee lugskepe gestuur om hulle daarmee te laat uitskiet of te verpletter" (Mr Hofmeyr will come and tell you all kinds of lies. This Mr. Hofmeyr is the man who had the Coloured people shot dead in South West Africa, over a small thing like a Dog Tax. When the poor people could not pay their taxes, then the same Mr. Hofmeyr had them shot dead. Apparently, it was about 50 men. What the Government couldn't understand was that there wasn't even one who had been wounded, and when the women and children of the people fled into the ridges or ravines, then Mr. Hofmeyr sent two warplanes to shoot or pulverise them).

On a different occasion Badenhorst had said "die 53 bruinmense het almal kopskote gekry, en die wat nie dood was nie het by verder gegeesel. En toe het hy twee lugskepe laat kom en laat boms afgooi op die vrouwens en kinders" ("The 53 coloured people all received headshots, and those who were not dead were further beaten. And then he sent two warplanes to drop bombs on the women and children")

Hofmeyr lost his bid to be elected for Riversdale. Smuts' party, the South Africa Party, was also defeated, although it won 48% of the vote, more than any other party. Hertzog's National Party won 40% and Creswell's Labour Party 7%, but the National Party won 78 seats, the South Africa Party 61, and Labour 5.

The election became known as the "Swart Gevaar" or "Black Peril" election, as Hertzog had focussed strongly on the threat to white people of the liberalism of Smuts and his party. Badenhorst's concern for the Coloured people of South West Africa was opportunistic at best.

== The years of litigation ==
=== Hofmeyr v Badenhorst ===
After the election, Hofmeyr persisted with his claim against Badenhorst.

Hofmeyr set out his reasons for doing so in his affidavit supporting his claim. "I found to my horror that these alleged statements conveyed the impression that I had been guilty of wilful and coldblooded murder"

"It was realised what a terrible blot it was on my character, and how adversely it might affect the prospects of my children – four sons and two sons-in-law, who had only just started on their various careers"

"The accusations have unquestionably placed me, as a public man, in a most unenviable position, especially with the Native and Coloured peoples of the Union, of whom there are many voters in the Cape Province, and my only course therefore was to appeal to the Supreme Court to remove this undeserved slur upon my name".

"I feel convinced that the statements coming from such a responsible man as [Badenhorst] contributed materially to my defeat at the polls"

"I desire to press for damages in the full amount of my claim, for the reason that my reputation is of the most vital importance to me, in view of the fact of my activities in the political arena in this country".

==== Hofmeyr's justification of his actions against the Bondelswarts ====
Hofmeyr sought to justify his actions against the Bondelswarts in his affidavit.

"I can declare that to the best of my knowledge and belief my troops were fired on first by the enemy in every engagement that took place, and that I heard of no irregularities on the part of my troops either during the operations or subsequent thereto... I was able to confirm official assurance... that throughout military operations ... nothing had been done by any of my troops which in any way merited rebuke or punishment, and that prisoners and wounded had been treated with every care and consideration". Hofmeyr's assertions conflict with evidence of prisoner mistreatment gathered by the official enquiry into the Bondelswarts affair.

Hofmeyr maintained that "it will be seen that I fully recognised my responsibility towards the tribe, and from the outset exhibited a friendly and helpful disposition towards them, which was emphasized in my official acts...[including] feeding their aged and other indigents at the expense of the Administration" This assertion is not supported by the evidence gathered at the official enquiry into the Bondelswarts affair or the conclusions of the SA Commission Report or the Mandates Commission Report.

Hofmeyr emphasized the importance of maintaining the honour and dignity of himself and the other whites involved. "It must be remembered that all my peace emissaries, including the Magistrate, the Superintendent of the Reserve and the Chief of Police, had suffered the indignity of being placed under arrest by armed Bondelswarts".

"In order to arrive at a peaceful settlement, I had done everything that was humanly possible and exercised great patience in the face of an insolent and tantalising attitude assumed by the leaders of the Bondelswarts. I had explored every avenue of hope to avoid a conflict." However, "every avenue" had in fact not been taken. The Mandates Commission found that Hofmeyr should have personally visited the Bondelswarts leaders to resolve the situation and that the repression of the uprising "appears to have been carried out with excessive severity, and had it been preceded by a demonstration of the overwhelming force at the command of the military authority, an immediate and perhaps bloodless surrender might have been anticipated".

Hofmeyr stated that the Bondelswarts had to be suppressed if South African control of South West Africa was to be maintained. "The Bondelswarts were at the time clearly spoiling for a fight and nothing short of according them freedom from all legal obligations and permission to roam at will to do what they like, would have stopped them. I was therefore right in making preliminary plans for possible field operations." This conflicted with Hofmeyr's statements made in 1921 and 1922 that he did not believe that any Native uprisings were imminent.

"I am accused in all seriousness of causing a number of Bondelswarts to be shot without cause or for such a paltry thing as the Dog Tax; of causing them all to be shot in the head; of causing those that were not dead to be scourged; and of causing women and children who had fled into the ravines and mountains to be pursued by aeroplanes and destroyed by bombs... I emphatically deny these accusations which I regard as a gross slander upon my character and personal honour". Badenhorst over-stated and exaggerated Hofmeyr's actions during the Bondelswarts affair. The allegations made by Badenhorst do not conform to the evidence before the South African commission of enquiry.

Hofmeyr was very aware that the use of warplanes had been controversial, especially that the bombing had killed women and children, and sought to justify his actions in relation to their use. "It was only after I had surveyed the whole position at Kalkfontein South and realised the difficulties to be met with the very meagre force at my disposal, that I reluctantly asked the Air Force of Pretoria to come to my assistance."

"I told van Ryneveld ... that on arrival at Guruchas he should circle a few times over the enemy's position and watch for signs of surrender before fighting ensued. I also asked him, if possible, to first demonstrate the effectiveness of the bombing by dropping one or two on cattle or stock if available, as a further inducement to the enemy to surrender. This was done with some cattle which, scared by the aeroplanes, had cleared into the open country. Instead of showing any sign of wishing to surrender, the enemy promptly fired at the aeroplanes... thereafter bombs were thrown on the enemy's position but with what effect I could not then tell." Hofmeyr had not mentioned these facts in his own earlier reports on the affair, nor in evidence to the various commissions of enquiry.

"I personally, from my position at the Guruchas fight, was not able to see a single Bondelswart, much less any women or children, and certainly could not see whether or not they were separately congregated... It never occurred to me as possible that Morris, an experienced man of modern and civilised warfare, would allow women and children to be mixed up with fighting men". Hofmeyr seems to be blaming Morris' unconventional actions for the deaths of the women and children. However, in the same affidavit Hofmeyr later asserts that "... it is a well-known fact that Natives generally do not always separate their womenfolk from the men in wartime."

"At any rate, I did not know at the time I surrounded the enemy at Guruchas, or even surmise, nor was it reported to me, that there were women and children, a fact discovered only after all fighting at that place had ceased. It is therefore a mischievous untruth to say that I sent aeroplanes specially after them to destroy them. I gave no such instructions, and I make bold to say that had I been inhuman or mad enough to issue them, van Ryneveld would not have obeyed them."

"I may add that I did not think it necessary to give detailed instructions to an officer of Sir Pierre van Ryneveld's standing, and I had every confidence in his integrity and judgement". This is a somewhat curious statement, given that it flatly contradicts Hofmeyr's earlier evidence in the same affidavit of the very precise instructions he gave to Van Ryneveld.

==== Judgement in Hofmeyr v Badenhorst ====
Judgement in the case was given by Gardiner JP, with which Sutton J concurred.

The judgement was deeply critical of Badenhorst. "[Badenhorst] was wanting in his candour in his explanation as to why he referred to the Bondelswarts trouble. He emphasised several times that at none of his meetings did he attack Mr Hofmeyr personally, that he did not even blame him for what occurred in South West Africa, but that he held Mr Hofmeyr responsible solely because he was a supporter of the South African Party Government, just as he had held him responsible for the Rebellion, the rising at Johannesburg, and the occurrences at Port Elizabeth and Bulhoek. I cannot accept this. I believe Mr Badenhorst attacked [Hofmeyr] for his personal conduct in connection with the Bondelswarts trouble".

"[Badenhorst] was ready to go beyond fair quotation from the [SA Commission Report] in his attack on [Hofmeyr], and it makes it probable that he did go beyond what was justified by the report in his speech".

The judge found in favour of Hofmeyr. "To my mind the words are clearly defamatory. Their ordinary meaning is that [Hofmeyr] caused a large number of people to be shot, because they could not pay their Dog Tax, and that he pursued fleeing women and children and destroyed them. Such conduct would be brutal, contrary to all civilised administration, and contrary to civilised warfare, and the man who was guilty of it would rightly be the object of the hatred and contempt of his fellow man".

The Judge dismissed the defence that the words complained of were true and in the public interest. "I think it is only right that I should say that not only is there no proof of the truth of the allegations, but that their falsity has been affirmatively proved.

The Judge specifically expressed "no opinion ...as to the wisdom of Mr Hofmeyr's policy in regard to the Bondelswarts" The Judge nonetheless then proceeded to describe why he felt that Hofmeyr was justified in acting as he did and suppressing the rebellion. "The Bondelswarts went far beyond a refusal to pay a tax. They declined to deliver up armed men, who had unlawfully come into their Reserve and had thereby committed criminal offences. They had resisted the arrest of these men and had resisted with a show of violence. When Colonel van Coller visited them in order to persuade them to observe the law, he was stopped by an armed man, and he found signs of military preparations. Arms, be it noted, were forbidden by law to the Bondelswarts, and the possession by them of arms was in itself an offence. In view of the attitude of the tribe, it would have been folly to attempt by ordinary police measures to enforce the law. The only thing to do was to assemble troops, in order that the law might be vindicated, if necessary by force. The Bondelswarts went into rebellion... Mr Hofmeyr had no other course open to him than to suppress the rebellion. I am satisfied that he was keenly desirous of effecting a peaceful settlement, and that he took every means that occurred to him to bring this about."

In relation to the use of warplanes and aerial bombs, the judge found that "it was also false to say that Mr Hofmeyr sent aeroplanes to pursue the women and children... unfortunately there were casualties among the women and children, which may have been caused by the bombs dropped. Whether further steps might have been taken to warn the Bondelswarts of the danger from the aeroplanes, threatening their women and children is a matter which I express no opinion."

The judge strongly disapproved of Badenhorst's behaviour. "The words used by [Badenhorst] ... were a cruel defamation of [Hofmeyr]. They were used at the place where [he] was born, to people who knew him well and among whom he had grown up, to a simple folk, who attached great importance the statements of a member of Parliament."

"I am not satisfied that it was indignation on account of the Bondelswarts that moved [Badenhorst]; what actuated him, in my opinion, was the desire to further his own candidature and to prejudice that of [Hofmeyr]."

Although Hofmeyr won the case, the damage had already been done and Badenhorst continued as the member of parliament for Riversdale. Hofmeyr's political career was over.

=== Lange v Hofmeyr ===
In the 1930s Hofmeyr was involved in further court action, this time as defendant. The plaintiff was a white settler in South West Africa, EJE Lange, who asserted that Hofmeyr, as Administrator, had not treated him fairly.

In 1924 Lange had petitioned the Mandates Commission for relief as he believed that the South West African Administration should have treated him more generously given that he had served the Union Government as a spy when the South African troops had arrived in [South West Africa] in 1915.

A farm had been granted to Lange by the German Government but Lange's right to the farm had subsequently been removed by the German Government as Lange had not fulfilled the conditions of the grant.

When the issue came before Hofmeyr as Administrator, Hofmeyr had said that Lange could be reinstated on the farm if the outstanding payments were made. However, Lange did not make any further payments and so he forfeited the right to the farm.

Hofmeyr had advised the Mandates Commission that the wife and children of Lange were living at Swakopmund where owing to their destitute condition it had been necessary for some time for the Administration to feed them. It had also provided free education for Lange's children.

Hofmeyr's view in 1924 was that Lange had no valid claim against the Administration.

==== Lange's claim ====
In April 1930 Hofmeyr received a letter from attorneys for Lange demanding a "full and unqualified apology in order to clear his name from the disgrace attached to the statements made by Hofmeyr about Lange in July 1924 before the Mandates Commission in Geneva".

The letter claimed that after serving the Union Government as a spy when the South African troops arrived in 1915, Lange had escaped in his fishing boat and had taken refuge in Angola. In this connection Hofmeyr had wished to call to the attention of the Mandates Commission the desirability of establishing a Treaty of Extradition between the Government of Portuguese West Africa and the Government of the Union, in order to ensure the extradition of criminals or undesirables taking refuge in either territory. Lange took this to mean that Hofmeyr had implied that Lange was a criminal and an undesirable, who had done dishonourable acts, lived disgracefully and was unworthy of respect."

Lange petitioned the court to sue Hofmeyr in forma pauperis (which would have enabled Lange to bring an action without paying the usual fees).

Hofmeyr engaged Albert Centlivres KC (later Chief Justice of South Africa from 1950 to 1957) and Newton Ogilvie Thompson (later Chief Justice of South Africa from 1971 to 1974) as counsel. The petition was dismissed.

Hofmeyr was unable to recover his costs from Lange as Lange did not have sufficient funds.

==== Recovery of costs ====
Given that the claim against Hofmeyr arose in his capacity as Administrator, Hofmeyr wrote to the South African prime minister Hertzog in May 1931 asking that the South African government pay the costs of defending the action that were not paid by Mr Lange.

Hofmeyr had previously appealed to Oswald Pirow (then Minister Justice) but Pirow had stated that Hertzog and Havenga (then Minister of Finance) must make the decision.

Hertzog declined to pay Hofmeyr's costs. Smuts was supportive of Hofmeyr's claims. In July 1931 Smuts wrote to Hofmeyr: "I have heard with astonishment that the Government have refused to refund the costs to which you have been put by the Lange case... I fail to understand why you should be made to suffer for what you have said or done in your capacity as Administrator and in the course of your duties."

Smuts provided an affidavit in support of Hofmeyr's claims. In August 1931 Smuts said that "during my tenure ... as Prime Minister... I had occasion to instruct [Hofmeyr] ... to proceed to Geneva and there attend the sittings of the [Mandates Commission]... in his official capacity as Administrator of South West Africa... [Hofmeyr] could not have refused to give information on petitions ... without causing embarrassment to the Union Government as Mandatory..."

Hofmeyr obtained a legal opinion from Albert Centlivres in September 1931, which he sent to Hertzog. Centlivres wrote that "In making the statements before the [Mandates Commission] ...[Hofmeyr] was acting as the agent of the Union Government.... [Hofmeyr] can recover the costs against the government".

Notwithstanding this, the South African government continued to refuse to reimburse Hofmeyr for his costs.

==== Renewed action by Lange ====
But the saga was not over. In February 1932 Hofmeyr received a statement of claim in which Lange claimed £5,000 for damages sustained by reason of false and defamatory statements made by Hofmeyr at the Mandates Commission in July 1924.

Lange now alleged that in February 1922 Hofmeyr had personally informed Lange that he was willing to restore Lange's farm to him on condition that Lange waived all claims against the government, which condition Lange refused to accept.

On 6 March 1932 Hofmeyr obtained an order staying this new action until Lange had paid Hofmeyr's costs in respect of the first action. Such costs were never paid by Lange, and so the matter was finally over.

== Last years ==
In 1930, 1931 and 1932 Hofmeyr was invited by the National Union of South African Students (NUSAS) to preside as "Speaker" at the annual Student Parliament.

=== Travel ===
In 1935 Hofmeyr undertook a world tour with his wife and eldest son, Harold, first sailing to London and then on to Canada in Canadian Pacific's "Duchess of Richmond". They crossed the continent to San Francisco, and then sailed via Honolulu to Melbourne. Harold, a doctor specialising in tropical diseases, was representing the Cape Province at the British Medical Association's conference in Melbourne. Hofmeyr was still positive about the British Commonwealth, saying that "I feel that the conference will strengthen the bonds of the Commonwealth, which mean so much to South Africa and the other Dominions." Hofmeyr summarised the remainder of their world tour: "I hope to visit New Zealand, and see something of their Maori community. Batavia, Singapore and Penange are on our itinerary... Colombo, Bombay and Calcutta are next, and finally, by way of the Seychelles and Mombasa, we return to Cape Town."

=== Welgemeend ===
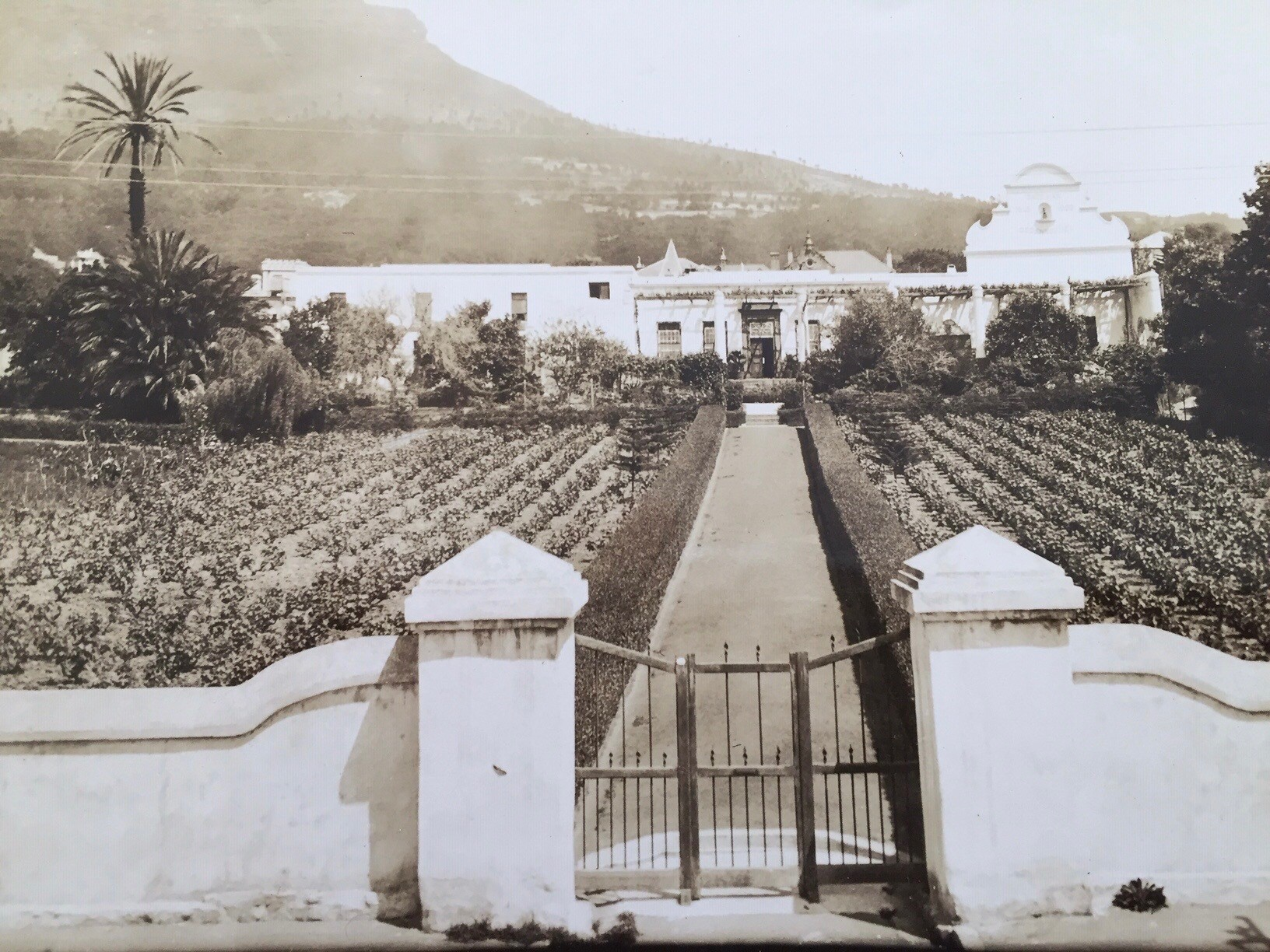
Welgemeend, home of Hofmeyr from 1914 to 1938

Hofmeyr's last years were spent in or close to Cape Town, including in the old Hofmeyr farmhouse on the slopes of Table Mountain named Welgemeend. Hofmeyrs had lived at Welgemeend since 1772 when Jan Hindrik Hofmeyr had married Maria Smuts, the then owner.

Gysbert Reitz Hofmeyr acquired Welgemeend on 14 May 1914 for £4,250 from his father's cousin, Tieleman Johannes Roos Hofmeyr. Tieleman was the brother of Onze Jan Hofmeyr, who had lived at Welgemeend for most of his life. Onze Jan moved from Welgemeend to Avondrust, a house on Stephen Street which he had built for him in 1902, and he lived there until his death in London in 1909. Avondrust was demolished by the Department of Education in 1950.

Hofmeyr's pride in his ancestry is evidenced by his addition of an ornate Cape Dutch gable on the west wing of Welgemeend in 1916. The niche in the gable housed a bust of Onze Jan Hofmeyr. The gable clashed with the style of the flat-roofed homestead and was demolished in 1950.

Hofmeyr transferred Welgemeend to his oldest son Harold Hofmeyr on 30 December 1938 for £9,000. On 21 March 1944 the house was proclaimed a National Monument (National Heritage Site) and on 2 August 1944 the house was expropriated for £14,000 and transferred to the Cape Education Department and is now part of Jan van Riebeeck school.

== Assessments ==
As the first Administrator of South West Africa under the League of Nations Mandate, Hofmeyr's record is mixed.

=== Economy ===
Wellington states that for the first ten years of the Mandate, with the exception of one drought year in 1925/6, the Administration was able to balance its budget. In this respect Hofmeyr had been a good colonial administrator. As far as the British were concerned, an unwritten rule of empire was that colonies should be fiscally self-sufficient.

Ruth First viewed it differently. For her, in the early days of the Mandate, South Africa looked upon her ward South West Africa as an expensive but strategically necessary stepchild. South Africa assumed the deficits incurred during the martial law period (1915 to 1920) and used the tax payments of the diamond companies during the war years to put the Administration on its economic feet. The 1920s were years of heavy expenditure on white settlement – criticized by many inside the country as reckless, and outside, by the League of Nations at Geneva, as consuming the substance of the non-white wards for the benefit of the guardians.

In 1933 the Union Government appointed a commission to investigate the dire economic position of South West Africa. Witnesses who appeared claimed that European land settlement had been carried out too rapidly and was "forced on an unwilling people by an Administration who brooked no interference and would not listen to the representations of the people".

A German member of the 1933 commission, Dr Hirsekorn, submitted a minority report criticising the Union's policy of bringing into the territory a very large number of South African nationals with undue haste and settling them on the land without proper regard to sound economic principles.

This he contrasted with the German practice which required white settlers to have capital of at least £1,000 and to pay one-tenth of the purchase price of their allotted farm. A loan would only be extended by the German administration to a white farmer against security over the farm. Boreholes were only provided on cash payment or by loans secured over the farm.

In contrast, Hofmeyr's Administration granted a prospective white settler a lease on a farm with the option of purchase. No rent was required for the first year, and very small amounts thereafter. After five years the white settler had the right to purchase the farm by 45 half-yearly instalments. Cash advances were made by the Mandatory Administration to white settlers of £750 to purchase stock, implements, seed and to build a dwelling house.

During Hofmeyr's tenure, Dr Hirsekorn stated, 880 farms had been allotted to 1,106 white settlers at a valuation of £637,000 and 186 farms had been sold to 207 white settlers for £94,000. During this time £248,000 cash had been advanced to white settlers and £201,000 expended in boring water for white settlers.

Hofmeyr believed the taking in of white settlers benefited the Union. His Advisory Council in December 1924 noted that "without making any contribution to the expenditure of the territory, the Union government has derived benefit therefrom inasmuch as it has been relieved of a large number of persons who have come to the territory as settlers and have received substantial financial assistance from the Administration."

Figures for the period 1920 to 1926 are not readily available but it is clear that a disproportionately small amount was spent on Native affairs. In 1935 out of a total ordinary expenditure of £613,000 the amount spent on Native affairs was £14,000. Of the education budget of £105,000, the amount allotted to Native education was £11,000.

=== Mandate Commission's assessment of Hofmeyr's Administration ===
Hofmeyr's Administration was subject to the review and assessment of the Mandates Commission, which not only monitored his actions but also tested compliance with Article 22 of the Covenant and the terms of the Mandate.

The Mandates Commission found that Hofmeyr had not discharged the "sacred trust" required under Article 22 of the Mandate to "promote to the utmost the material and moral well-being and the social progress of the inhabitants".". It also criticised Hofmeyr's handling of the Bondelswarts affair, found that Hofmeyr had used "excessive severity" against the Bondelswarts, and criticised the use of warplanes against lightly armed tribesman. These findings are considered in more detail below.

=== Discharge of the "Sacred Trust" ===
Wellington reflects that in the century from 1860 to 1960 the human race appears to have passed – or to have been struggling to pass- from one stage of human relationships to the next higher stage. In the mid-nineteenth century it was in the "stab and grab" stage, whether this involves the conquest of a weaker tribe by a stronger, or the "might is right" policy adopted by the more civilised world powers.

In South West Africa (and elsewhere) the powerful white man concocts causes, destroys defenders, seizes desirable land, reduces the hapless Natives to the condition of helots and establishes "civilisation". The territory is "protected", occupied, annexed, civilized; might has been proved once more to be the effective form of right.

For Wellington the process contained the seeds of its own destruction and in 1919 the victorious leaders decided to put an end to a state of affairs that had destroyed so many millions of human beings. Where it concerned "peoples not yet able to stand by themselves under the strenuous conditions of the modern world" a new human standard is accepted. Article 22 of the League Covenant imposed the obligation to “promote to the utmost the material and moral well-being and social progress of the inhabitants of the territory" which formed "a sacred trust of civilisation".

As the first Administrator under the Mandate, Hofmeyr's role was to work out what this new standard of civilisation meant in practice. Hofmeyr played a critical role in setting the template for the administration of South West Africa under the Mandate. Did Hofmeyr comply with the terms of the Mandate and “promote to the utmost the material and moral well-being and social progress of the inhabitants of the territory"?

Wellington is critical of Hofmeyr's Administration. "In South West Africa the Administration of the Mandate was carried out with two apparent immediate objects: the bringing into the territory of as many white Union settlers as possible; and the containing of the indigenous people in defined Reserves where they could not obstruct the process of white settlement but would be available as labourers for the settlers.

For Wellington, the crux of the matter is that the Mandatory, having been directed to make the welfare of the Natives its chief concern, seized the best land for its own white subjects, relegating its wards who were "not yet able to stand by themselves under the strenuous conditions of the modern world" to areas too small for their sustenance.

For example, the Bondelswarts had been confined to a mere fragment of their former domain. Their Reserve was 170,000 hectares (1,750 square kilometres), down from an area of approximately 40,000 square kilometres in the 1850s. The Reserve was desert and semi-desert. The normal size of a white man's farm in this part was 15,000 hectares.

Wellington asks "is it to be wondered that the Bondels family, with one-ninth of the land available to the white family, should find it well nigh impossible to keep the veld in good heart under such conditions?

Wellington's view was that Hofmeyr's Administration comprehensively failed to discharge the "sacred trust".

"The white man has taken for himself the best farming land of the territory and on a basis of calculation most favourable to his cause, the area per head of total population that he has taken for himself is ten times that of the land he has allowed the Native to occupy.

"On the basis of the number of people actually holding or occupying the land the white man has taken thirty times the per capita area of land he has allotted to the Natives. If the availability of water is taken into account this proportion could be of the order of fifty to one."

Wellington's verdict: "given by humanity a "sacred trust" to foster and further the interests of the indigenous people of South West Africa, the plain fact emerges that the whites put their own interests first and foremost."

Wellington did not limit his criticism to the taking of land. "By enactments and administrative processes, which the whites ... kept exclusively in their hands, the whites ... used the natural resources of the territory to give their children the best possible education, while neglecting to educate in any sense adequately the children of the people who were their sacred trust. Policies of the whites ... had the effect of necessitating that large numbers of the indigenous people had to work for whites. And whites did these things in the name of Western Christian civilisation which outrightly rejects such attitudes and policies".

The Mandate Commission on several occasions expressed its dissatisfaction with the attitude of Hofmeyr, the Administration and the Union to its "sacred trust".

Nonetheless, Hofmeyr's actions were in line with what Smuts required. In May 1924 Smuts writes to Hofmeyr: "You have asked me for instructions. I have really no instructions to give you. You know my views and are every day carrying out my policy in regard to the Mandated territory. When you appear before the [Mandates Commission] I want you to discuss your Native policy with them in detail and to make them understand the situation, which I fear they do not at the moment, their whole point of view being clouded by the Bondelswarts affair which they have magnified out of all proportion to its importance."

The Mandates Commission formally deplored the absence of "social progress" of Blacks in the territory. The disparity in wealth troubled the Commission, as also the importation into South West Africa of pass laws and segregation legislation.

Writing in 1963, Ruth First is similarly critical, although her focus is on General Smuts rather than on Hofmeyr. First writes that "in 1920 General Smuts, though familiar with the wording of Article 22, could have had little intention of observing its spirit. Still firmly fixed in his mind were the arguments for regarding South West Africa as a mere extension of South Africa, despite any sacred trust for the territory's indigenous inhabitants that he had assumed".

Ruth First said that "the policies initiated in the first years of the Mandate are those for which South Africa is today still having to account before the world. The foundations of African poverty and white supremacy were laid in those lean years.

The 1933 Commission appointed by the Union recognised that the "sacred trust" was not being honoured. The Commission found that "the Union had accepted the tutelage of the Natives as a sacred trust. It is therefore incumbent on the Union to make some effort to raise the Natives from their present backward state. At present Native education in the territory is largely in the hands of foreign missionaries over whom the Administration does not exercise much control. Much of the educational activity is limited to religious education".

The 1933 Commission reported that in South West Africa in 1935 the per capita expenditure on education was £3 7s for whites and 4d for Natives, and one of the commissioners noted that this was in striking contrast to the avowed policy of treaty whites and Natives alike. At the time, there were twelve pennies to a shilling and 20 shillings (or 240 pence) to a pound; so for the four pennies spent on the education of each Native, the Administration spent 804 pennies on the education of each white (over 200 hundred times more).

To many observers, it seemed that the methods of the former German administrators, which had been so bitterly condemned by the British and Union Governments, were in fact little or no worse than the overwhelmingly pro-white administration of the Mandatory power.

Notwithstanding his initial good intentions, Hofmeyr had introduced a series of "ugly laws" that established the superior economic and political status of the whites.

Ruth First's view was that the social, economic and health policies of the Administration were characterized by "a ruthless neglect and callousness; and these policies were deliberate."

Hofmeyr's views on racial policy were not dissimilar to many other political leaders of his time and criticism of those leaders applies equally to Hofmeyr.

Ruth First noted in 1963 that "it remains a frightening fact that not a single White political leader in South West Africa has ever advocated a non-racial democracy."

==== British attitudes of the time ====
What Hofmeyr implemented in South West Africa was not only what Smuts required and desired but was in many respects fully in line with what the British expected. This is evident from a speech given in Windhoek in 1919 by Viscount Buxton, the Governor General of South Africa appointed by Britain.

Buxton approved the rapid introduction of white settlers from South Africa, and was pleased that the non-German element (4,000 British subjects, nearly all Dutch-speaking Africanders) was in 1919 already about half as large as the German community, and that before long there would certainly be a considerable influx from the Union.

Buxton noted that relations between the German settlers and the Natives had been and were still bad. He said that "on the one hand I informed the Natives emphatically that they would in future be protected from ill-treatment, on the other I impressed upon them the obligation which they were under of rendering good and willing service to their employers. Why or how such an obligation arose was not explained.

Buxton elaborated: "it is incumbent upon the Natives to carry out their service ... in a proper manner ... without impertinence and indolence, to be obedient and respectful, and not to bring trivial complaints against their employers". Buxton's vision was for the Natives to be submissive and compliant.

The theme of Natives providing labour for whites was central for Buxton: "To the Natives I would say that they may look to the law and the administration to protect them from violence, inhumanity and injustice; from forced unpaid labour, from the curse of drink, and from the temptation of arms. But all this puts an equivalent obligation on them, and the law will best be able to protect them if they, on their part, obey the law and do their best to render willing service". Buxton promised justice, but only on the understanding that the Natives should know their place and provide willing service to the whites.

Notwithstanding this, Buxton also offered lofty ideals, none of which were extended to the Natives by Hofmeyr's Administration.

Buxton offered hope: "[the Natives] can be assured ... that the laws which prohibited Natives from occupation or communal ownership of land and ownership of cattle will be abolished". In the event this promise was not kept.

Buxton offered liberty: "The British Empire, of which the Union is a part, has no desire nor ambition merely to paint red this or any other portion of the map. What matters is behind the paint; and our aim is that, here and elsewhere, there shall be liberty of person and of conscience, just laws and a contented people". In the event, Natives were not afforded liberty of person or conscience or just laws by the new Mandatory power.

Buxton offered equality: "the administration will be based on the principle that the Europeans, the Natives and the Coloured communities, the indigenous population as well as the settlers, are equally entitled to receive, and will receive, even-handed justice.... The influence of the law ... will not be exercised on behalf of either one or the other... the administration will not tolerate any harsh treatment of the Natives and will make no distinction between Black and White where an offence has been committed". In the event, matters did not turn out this way.

It is easy to understand that Native hopes were raised by this speech, and to see how such hopes would have been dashed once the true nature of the new Mandatory Administration of Hofmeyr became apparent. The fact that Hofmeyr's Administration fell short of these ideals promised by Buxton is also apparent.

==== Smuts and John X Merriman ====
Smuts is sometimes presented as an enlightened far-seeing leader. However, like Hofmeyr, Smuts failed to reconcile his liberal instincts with his reluctance to grant political rights to non-Europeans.

At the 1923 Imperial Conference, Smuts was adamant that he could not give equal rights to Indians in South Africa. Employing tortuous logic, Smuts stated that while the Crown was the binding link between the parts of the Empire, it was not the source of civil and political rights – a citizen derived his rights simply and solely from the law of the state in which he lived.

Smuts insisted that equal rights for Indians in South Africa would lead to equal rights for Natives and that would mean the end of South Africa. "We are up against a stone wall, and we cannot get over it". Hofmeyr would have agreed.

John X Merriman was another liberal who thought deeply about the "Native question" but ultimately, he too could not escape the prejudices of his times.

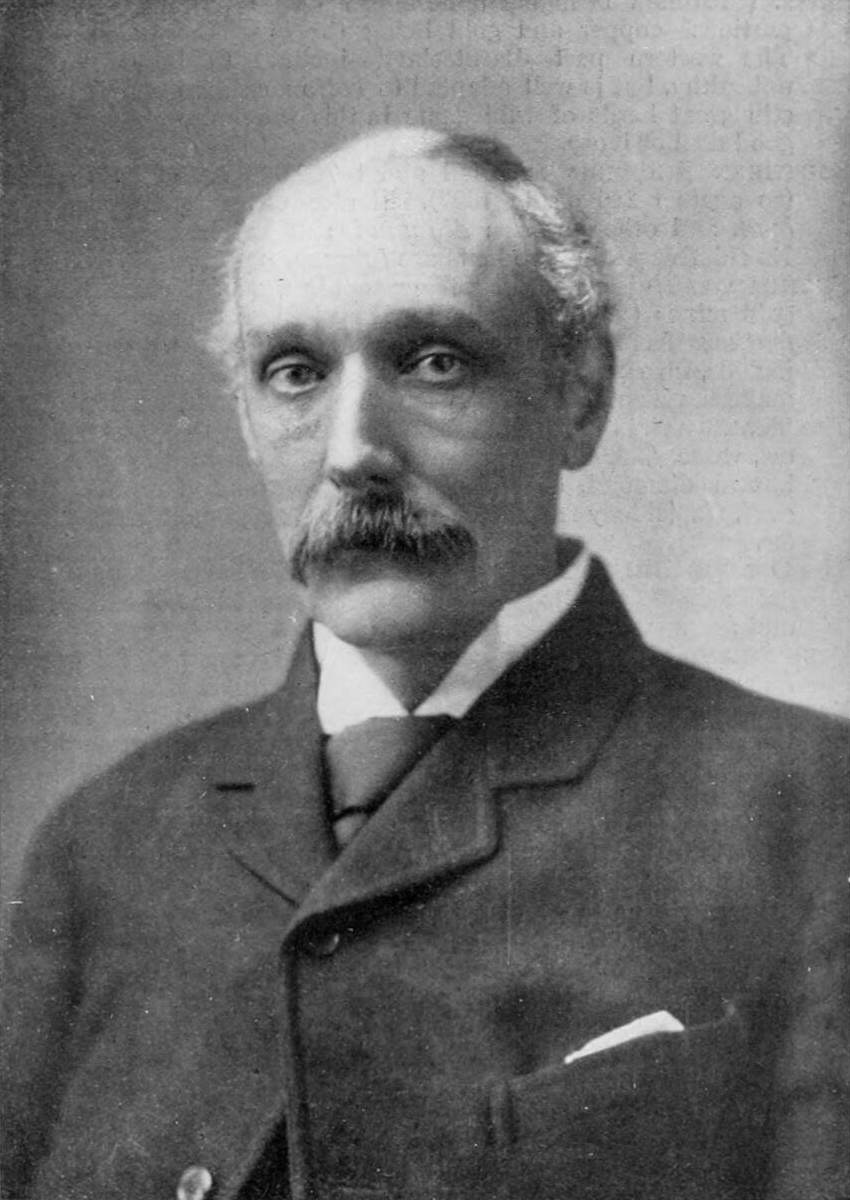
John X Merriman – Cape liberal and Last Prime Minister of the Cape Colony before the formation of the Union of South Africa

In 1906 Merriman disagreed with a memorandum written by Smuts on the proposed union. "What struck me at once in reading your admirable remarks on liberal principles was that you ignore three quarters of the population because they are Coloured".

Merriman then qualifies this enlightened thinking: "I do not like the Natives at all and I wish that we had no Black man in South Africa. But there they are, our lot is cast with them by an overruling providence and the only question in show to shape our course so as to maintain the supremacy of our race and at the same time do our duty".

In response, Smuts was unapologetic. "In principle I am entirely at one with you on the Native question. I sympathize profoundly with the Native races of South Africa whose land it was long before we came here to force a policy of dispossession on them. And it ought to be the policy of all parties to do justice to the Natives and to take all wise and prudent measures for their civilisation and improvement. But I don't believe in politics for them... politics will only have an unsettling influence. I would therefore not give them the franchise."

Smuts continued: "when I consider the political future of the Natives in South Africa I must say that I look into shadows and darkness; and then I feel inclined to shift the intolerable burden of solving that sphinx problem to the ampler shoulders and stronger brains of the future."

Merriman was unconvinced: "God forbid I should advocate a general political enfranchisement of the Native barbarian. All I think is required for our safety is that we shall not deny him the franchise on account of colour.... The only alternative is physical force."

==== "Peoples not yet able to stand for themselves" ====
Although the Covenant of the League of Nations was an attempt to impose "civilised" standards throughout the world, it too regarded the Natives as not yet ready for political rights. Article 22 of the League's covenant, replete with lofty, imperial rhetoric, spoke of "those colonies and territories ... which are inhabited by peoples not yet able to stand by themselves under the strenuous conditions of the modern world".

From this principle, the League put in place a system that categorised former German and Ottoman territories based on their perceived levels of civilisation and preparedness for self-government. It put into international practice the bureaucratised coding of racial and cultural differences inherent to the British Empire. Such differences were explicitly inscribed into class A, B and C Mandates, with class A Mandates such as Palestine and Syria furthest along in their preparedness to "stand alone". At the bottom sat places like South West Africa. Europeans conceived of them as so backward and childlike that any kind of self-government for them lay in the very distant future.

Is it correct that at the time of the Covenant of the League of Nations the Natives in South West Africa were "not yet able to stand by themselves"?

There are some striking examples of astute political understanding, of how indigenous peoples understood very clearly what was happening to them and displayed moral values and compassion in line with "western" and "Christian" values.

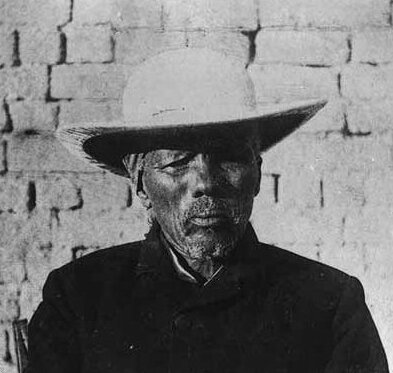
Nama chief Hendrik Witbooi

In 1890 the Germans tried to convince the Nama chief, Hendrik Witbooi, to accept German "protection". In trying to persuade Witbooi to accept this, the German administrator Curt von Francois stated that Hendrik "will have jurisdiction over his own people if he accepts protection". This puzzled Witbooi, who said he cannot conceive of how a chief, being an independent chief and ruler over his own land and people (as every chief is) can, if he accepts protection from another, still be regarded as an independent chief. "Everyone under protection is a subject of the one who protects him".

Hendrik Witbooi went on: "Peace which comes from the stopping of the ammunition supply is no true peace, for true peace comes from the heart".

Subsequently the Germans attacked Witbooi's stronghold at Hoornkrans. Women and children fell into German hands, but the fighters withdrew into the Naukluft Mountains. When asked by the new German governor, Leutwein, to talk peace, Witbooi retorted "[You] did not open fire on me for the sake of peace, but because I was at peace. [You] tried to shoot me not because of any misdeed whether by word or act, but only because I refused to surrender that which is mine alone, to which I have a right. I would not surrender my independence".

In 1892 Hendrik Witbooi wrote to an English magistrate in Walvis Bay (then under British control): "The German ... makes no requests according to truth and justice and asks no permission of a chief. He introduces laws into the land which are entirely impossible, untenable, unbelievable, unbearable, unmerciful and unfeeling.... He personally punishes our people at Windhoek and has already beaten people to death for debt... he flogs people in a shameful and cruel manner. We stupid and unintelligent people, for so he thinks us to be, we have never yet punished a human being in such a cruel and improper way for he stretches people on their backs and flogs them on the stomach and even between the legs, be they male or female, so your Honour can understand that no one can survive such a punishment". Incisive thinking, and surely "able to stand for himself"?

Before the outbreak of the rebellion against the Germans in 1904, the Herero chiefs resolved to limit their attack to German men of military age. No women or children were to be harmed and no Englishmen, Boers or missionaries were to be harmed. Their fight was with the German Government and soldiers and the German settlers and traders. It has been stated that this was probably the first occasion when African Natives deliberately limited their warlike operation against Europeans. The Europeans did not impose similar restrictions on themselves.

In 1924, when Chief Kutako was complaining about the allocation of desert land at Epukiro as the new Reserve for the Herero, he asked an official "how is it that when [the Herero] inhabited South West Africa, and the [Rehobothers] were wanting land and came to Chief Samuel Maherero, he gave them a country to live in which had open water. Now you want to drive us to places where there is no water. When the [Rehobothers] came they were only a handful, but because they had a land given them by us they are becoming a big people. Why do you not do for us what Chief Samuel Maharero did for them?" The question reflected a refined moral judgement but was never answered satisfactorily.

The same mature reflection was evident in the evidence of a Herero witness who in 1946 said to Michael Scott, a promoter of Namibian independence that "What we don't understand is that when two nations have been at war, such as Britain or Germany or Italy, and when one or other of those nations is defeated the lands belonging to the nation are not taken away from them.... The African people, although they have always been on the side of the British people and their allies, yet have their lands taken away from them and are treated as though they had been conquered".

These examples suggest that the descriptions of the Natives as under-developed, uncivilised or barbaric are far from the truth.

=== Bondelswarts affair ===
There can be little doubt that the Bondelswarts affair and the manner of its suppression, for which Hofmeyr was primarily responsible, cast a long shadow over the international reputation of South Africa.

Certainly, it cast a long shadow over the Bondelswarts. Lewis, writing in 1977, sums it up as follows: "the Bondelswarts tribe was shattered by the revolt. Defeated and impoverished, their loss of pride led to increased demoralisation and abuse of alcohol, so that the Bondelswarts people today are a mere scattered semblance of their former greatness".

Writing in 1952, General Smuts' own son admits that "the Bondelswarts affair ... left a bad taste."

Lewis' assessment of Hofmeyr's role in the affair is that Hofmeyr was well-meaning, sincere and paternalistic in his attitude to the Blacks. But he was also too stubborn, too proud and over-hasty in his dealings. Hofmeyr's criticisms of the majority findings of the SA Commission Report were unfounded. He was too proud and unbending in his assertion of white "dignity" to undergo the possible humiliation of an armed Bondelswarts escort into Guruchas. Hofmeyr and the white Administration were too much obsessed with upholding their dignity, and too little concerned with humanity and understanding.

Ultimately, the resistance symbolised the last flicker of a bygone era. Lewis asserts that both the Bondelswarts and Hofmeyr were at fault – but that the Administration's actions are all the more shameful because of its greater strength and technological prowess.

Rhodes, towards the end of his life, excused himself before his fellows at Oxford for his rough-and-ready, and not the highest, way of removing opposition and attaining his object. "Yet you must look back to far-off times in English history for a parallel to the state of things in South Africa where not a few men who have done good service to the state have adopted the violence of their age in actions which are hard to justify in a more peaceful and law-abiding age. It is among these men that my own life and actions must be weighed..." Hofmeyr might have made the same plea.

=== "Excessive Severity"? ===
The Mandates Commission Report found that the repression of the Bondelswarts uprising "appears to have been carried out with excessive severity".

Many others after the event criticised Hofmeyr for authorising unduly harsh actions. However, Hofmeyr was in many ways simply following established precedent, including the examples of General Smuts and the standard British procedures of his time. Some of these examples and procedures are briefly considered below.

==== Ukuanyama affair (1917) ====
Hofmeyr was not the first South African Administrator of South West Africa involved in action against Natives.

In 1917 the Ukuanyama community led by Chief Mandume had fought the Portuguese in the north and the South Africans to the south to try to retain their autonomy. After extended battles with the Portuguese in which some 5,000 Natives were killed, Mandume and some of his people fled south into South West Africa. Mandume refused the South Africans' demand to surrender, and combined South African and Portuguese forces marched on Mandume and Mandume was killed in action together with 100 of his people. The South Africans suffered 9 dead and 13 wounded.

The head of Chief Mandume was brought to Windhoek and displayed to show that the resistance had been overcome. It was later buried near the railway station.

Administrator Gorges declared "the country is now entirely tranquil. Our representatives in Ovamboland will continue to watch the situation closely and do all in their power to induce the able-bodied men of the different tribes to go south to engage themselves as labourers on the railways, mines and farms...".

==== Bulhoek (1921) ====
At Bulhoek in the Eastern Cape a conflict developed between the state and the Israelites, a Bantu church which wanted to break away from the white man's Christianity and to live under its own leaders within its own religious communities.

In the white officials' eyes the Israelites were persistent squatters on common land. Smuts sent his new Native Affairs Commission – comprising Senator AW Roberts, Dr CT Loram and General Lemmer (the same individuals who comprised the South African commission of enquiry into the Bondelswarts uprising) to negotiate with the Israelites.

On 6 April 1921 the three commissioners had long discussions with the leaders of the Israelites. The Israelites said that they would like to obey the law, but that Jehovah was more powerful than the law and that they feared to offend him by disregarding his wishes and obeying the wishes of men. Discussions continued without result.

The Johannesburg newspaper The Star was critical of the government and insistent that force would have to be used to uphold the law – massive force, The Star demanded, for then there would be less likelihood of the Israelites resisting it.

On 24 May 1921 Smuts deployed an 800 strong police force against 500 Israelites who were armed with spears and knobkerries. After a twenty minute battle, 163 Israelites were dead, 129 wounded and 95 were taken as prisoners. Casualties on the government side amounted to one trooper wounded and one horse killed.

On 25 May Smuts rose in the House of Assembly: "no one regrets what has happened at Bulhoek more than the Government... I am persuaded in my own mind that there was no alternative for the police but to fire as they did. I am sure that the Government has done its best to avoid bloodshed, and to make it plain to the people that, whether White or Black, they have to submit to and obey the law of the land.... And the law of the land will be carried out in the last resort as fearlessly against Black as against White".

Hancock comments that Smuts would have done better in his concluding sentences to have expressed grief at the tragic loss of life.

In open contradiction of the opinions which it had expressed earlier, The Star blamed the government for sending too large a force to Bulhoek, and it also blamed it for not frightening the Israelites into submission by bombing them from the air.

Although there were widespread calls for a commission of enquiry, the government's final decision was not to appoint a commission of enquiry.

The similarities to the Bondelswarts punitive expedition are striking. However, one of the differences between this affair and that of the Bondelswarts was that the Administration of South West Africa was subject to the supervision of the Mandates Commission.

==== Rand Revolt (1922) ====
White mine workers went on strike in 1921 when mining companies tried to cut their operating costs by decreasing wages and by weakening the colour bar by promoting cheaper Black mine workers to skilled and supervisory positions previously reserved to whites. The conflict soon escalated into open rebellion by white miners and white commandos against the state.

In March 1922 Smuts declared martial law. He announced that the police were under attack all over the Rand and that the fighting was going badly for them and then personally assumed command (as Hofmeyr did a few months later in the Bondelswarts punitive expedition).

At military headquarters Smuts learnt that the commandos were holding almost the entire Rand. In three days of fierce fighting Smuts suppressed the insurrection.

Smuts wrote to his friend Margaret Gillett: "We have passed through a bad time... the Commandos, which had been drilling and marching on the Rand, suddenly and mysteriously became armed with rifles and attacked the police, inflicting heavy casualties. So martial law and the rest of it. And I have earned an additional claim to the titles of butcher and hangman".

A commission of enquiry was launched. It found that Smuts used larger forces than were strictly required but saved lives by doing so. Nevertheless, the casualty lists were grievous. In total, the commission declared that 176 soldiers, 115 police and 396 civilians had died in the fighting.

General Hertzog attacked Smuts for a pattern of violence. Hertzog (as reported by the Cape Argus) said that "everywhere Smuts had indulged in a policy of shooting down. The passive resistance of Mahatma Gandhi was the first occasion. Then came the shooting in 1913, and the illegal deportations. Then the rebellion – shooting down and murder. Then the war, which had distracted the Prime Minister's attention. Then the Native trouble at Port Elizabeth – shooting again. Then Bulhoek – shooting again; and then the trouble on the Rand – shooting again. ... the Prime Minister's footsteps dripped with blood...".

==== British punitive expeditions ====
Wellington notes that what happened in South West Africa in the 1920s was directly out of the British colonial playbook. "As in all colonial possessions where the settlement of white colonists is intended, the transfer of the best land from the aborigines to the colonists involves conflict. By wile or blatant lying the new Government finds "just causes" for depriving the Natives of the desired land; resistance is crushed and the process is justified before world opinion by the necessity of firm action in the face of rebellion. In South Africa by the Boers and the British, in South West Africa by the Germans, the process gradually transferred most of the best land from the Natives to the Whites, as, indeed, happened in the New World and Australasia where White and non-White interests clashed.

The specific tactic of punitive expeditions was acknowledged. Colonel Charles Callwell, a graduate of the Royal Military Academy at Woolwich and a veteran of 19th century imperial wars, wrote "Small Wars: Their Principles and Practices" in 1896 and updated it after the Second Boer War. The book was adopted as an official British Army textbook and won wide recognition.

For Colonel Callwell, when European troops engaged in wars against the "uncivilised" and "savage" populations of the world, as opposed to civilised armies, they needed a different set of rules. Callwell pointed to the "moral force of civilisation" that underwrote European superiority and the need to teach "savage" peoples "a lesson which they will not forget". For Callwell, waging total destruction against an enemy brought more than just strategic advantages; brutality wrought on "uncivilised" peoples he emphasized, also had a "moral effect... savages must be thoroughly brought to book and cowed or they will rise again".

Hofmeyr was following this tradition. In his report on the Bondelswarts affair he states that "The use of force was no seeking of mine and I regret that it was necessary, but when once it became clear that there was no alternative, I was determined to inflict a severe and lasting lesson".

For Hancock, Hofmeyr had followed the established practice of colonial governments in Africa. Punitive expeditions had been the normal and – so the administrators and soldiers usually maintained – the necessary concomitant of the establishment of European authority.

Hancock remarks that if the punitive expeditions in Kenya between 1890 and 1910 had been marked on the map there would have been few if any blank spaces except in the desert areas.

Similarly, if a record had been compiled of punitive expeditions in the Lango district of Uganda from 1910 to 1920 there would be few if any blank years. To be sure, they became less frequent with the years – nevertheless severe punitive expeditions took place in Kenya in 1925 and again in 1929.

Hofmeyr's handling of the Bondelswarts affair was not abnormal, but it received abnormal attention and publicity. That was the inevitable consequence of South West Africa's status as a Mandated territory.

=== Use of warplanes ===
Much of the criticism of Hofmeyr has been focussed on his use of military airplanes, aerial bombs and strafing against lightly armed Natives including women and children. Abhorrent as this use may be, it was not exceptional as very similar actions were being taken by the British and others in the 1920s.

The Bondelswarts punitive expedition was not the first time airplanes had been used to suppress Natives. In 1920 the Royal Air Force had used bombers against the forces of Mohammed Abdullah Hassan, the "Mad Mullah", in the Somaliland Campaign.

In the Iraqi Revolt in the 1920s the British embraced air power as an economical means of colonial policing. Bombing played an important part in the suppression of the revolt with the RAF dropping 100 tonnes of bombs. The RAF could destroy villages with impunity whereas the more traditional punitive column involved hundreds of soldiers taking casualties to accomplish the same end.

A description by Caroline Elkins of pilot Arthur "Bomber" Harris in 1923 over the Mesopotamian desert (now Iraq) one evening could almost be referring to Colonel van Ryneveld and the Bondelswarts Rebellion. "A village emerged with shadowy figures scurrying across it frantically in search of temporary shelter. These so-called recalcitrant men, women and children, not to mention their homes and livestock, were Bomber's targets. ... with Bomber's go ahead, the plane released its deadly cargo, and flames erupting from below soon pierced the evening sky. As the plane disappeared, the pilot scarcely heard the secondary explosions from the delayed action bombs or the screams of pain and loss that accompanied them".

Winston Churchill was colonial secretary at the time. Churchill found that this use of airplanes was a way to police and subdue the empire on the cheap while also inaugurating an early twentieth century version of shock and awe. Behind closed doors and in secret memoranda, officials enthused over the "'frightfulness' in a more or less severe form" and the "real casualties and material damage" being inflicted.

As untold suffering unfolded in the desert, far from the media's reach and prying liberal eyes, Iraq became a playground for British weapons testing.

In 1922 London's Air Ministry circulated a "Forms of Frightfulness" memo in which it considered smoke bombs, aerial darts, tear gas, phosphorus bombs, war rockets, long delay "action" bombs, tracer ammunition, man-killing shrapnel bombs, "liquid" fire (the precursor of napalm) and crude oil to pollute water supplies. Such consequences mattered little to the Air Ministry's brigadier general: "I am of the opinion that for a given carrying weight of aeroplane high explosive bombs or shrapnel bombs are superior to any other forms of frightfulness".

In 1924 Bomber Harris was the most articulate in painting a portrait of the scenes unfolding beneath British aircraft: "the Arab and Kurd... now know what real bombing means, in casualties and damage; they now know that within forty-five minutes a full-sized village can be practically wiped out and a third of its inhabitants killed or injured by four or five machines which offer them no real target, no opportunity for glory as warriors, no effective means of escape". Accompanying the memo were photos of the destroyed village of Kushan-Al -Ajaza.

Bomber Harris's description and photos evaded the public eye. They had been part of a larger report to the British Parliament in 1924, when Britain's first Labour government came to power and wanted some form of Royal Air Force assessment on "heavy casualties caused by air policing". The realities of air control were swept under the rug. British officials were massaging the air control body count.

Reports by the Royal Air Force's Sir Hugh Trenchard defended air control theology to the House of Lords while reminding its members of the alternative moral universe of their Arab subjects: "The Natives of a lot of these tribes love fighting for fighting's sake. ... they have no objection to being killed”.

The Royal Air Force's 1924 report "Note on the Method of Employment of the Air Arm in Iraq" had been a whitewash. It had expunged Harris' account of wiping out Arabs and Kurds and omitted any mention of one British staff officer's denunciation of the Royal Air Force's bomb-induced deaths of nearly two dozen women and children in a crowded bazaar as "the nearest thing to wanton slaughter". Instead, the report was a compendium of air control's virtues as a modern-day method of containing ungovernable populations.

Punitive raids rarely made the official news. British Army officer John Grafton, in Palestine from 1926, commented: "when you had terrorists, or frontiersmen in India, doing something they shouldn't ... you went in and knocked the living daylights out of the place... the Royal Air Force used to bomb the villages".

The bombings continued, not only in the Middle East but elsewhere in Britain's empire, despite ongoing criticism. When Britain targeted the North-West Frontier Province and other parts of India, the army's commander in chief in India, Philip Chetwode, wrote a memo to the viceroy – a memo that he was later forced to retract – stating – "I loathe bombing and never agree to it without a guilty conscience... it is to me a revolting method of making war, especially by a great power against tribesman".

The most trenchant critique came from subjects of Empire. While British airmen bombed the Mahsud villages in Afghanistan's borderland region where resistance to colonial rule persisted, one plane crash-landed, and several old women brandishing knives confronted the airmen. Instead of harming them, the elderly villagers led the fliers to a cave's safety where, together, they rode out another 24 hours of bombing. The villagers then escorted the airmen out of harm's way.

Rabindranath Tagore wrote "The West has made wonderful progress. She has opened her path across the ethereal region of the earth; the explosive force of the bomb has developed its mechanical power of wholesale destruction to a degree that could be represented in the past only by the personal valour of a large number of men. But such enormous progress has made Man diminutive. He proudly imagines that he expresses himself when he displays the things that he produces and the power that he holds in his hands. The bigness of the results and the mechanical perfection of the apparatus hide from him the fact that the Man in him has been smothered".

British practice did not change after the 1920s. In 1938, during the Arab Revolt, the RAF dropped delayed action bombs, dive-bombed with regularity, front guns blazing, and shook villages to their core with a series of twenty-pound bombs. The RAF was responsible for nearly half the official enemy kills during the Arab Revolt: one reconnaissance mission alone wiped out nearly 130 Arab rebels; on other occasions bagging a score or more was typical.

Bomber Harris was head of the RAF Bomber Command in the Second World War. While Churchill had shown no mercy in using aerial destruction on subjects in the Empire, he fretted endlessly over unleashing similar tactics on European civilians. But in the summer of 1943, the RAF levelled Hamburg – an assault that took the lives of forty-five thousand people, who perished largely in a two-day firestorm, and left a million people homeless.

The bombing offensive continued, as Britain's imperial tested air forces reduced Dresden and other German cities to rubble.

Hofmeyr's actions need to be considered in this full historical context where the aerial bombing of Natives by European powers was the norm for the 1920s.

=== Mandate Commission inconsistency ===
As a colonial representative rather than a direct representative of one of the great powers, the Mandates Commission was rather less lenient in its attitude towards Hofmeyr's actions. Hofmeyr would have had justification for feeling that the Mandates Commission had been harsh on him if one considers the Mandates Commission's response to the Great Syrian Revolt of 1925–27.

Syria was at that time administered under a League of Nations Mandate by France. There was a general uprising in Syria aimed at getting rid of French rule. The French bombarded civilians in Damascus, an undefended and historic city.

The bombardment happened on 19 October 1925, the very day the Mandates Commission convened in Geneva for their seventh session. Ever more harrowing accounts appeared in the London Times, but the Mandates Commission did nothing – taking the view that their role was to review not direct policy.

The bombardment became a cause celebre, making headlines and drawing protests across the world. French behaviour had upended civilizational assumptions, for it was the French who acted barbarically.

The British Foreign Secretary, Austen Chamberlain, thought that the whole sorry mess needed to be contained as quickly as possible, and that the British needed to help the French do that. The British representative on the Mandates Commission Frederick Lugard failed to hold the French to account. Discussions of petitions alleging widespread atrocities – of bombardment of undefended villages, use of human shields, rape as a weapon of war, massive looting – were pushed off to a later session, a decision that gave the French Foreign Ministry time to instruct officials in Syria to produce a report rebutting every charge – rebutting but not investigating them.

Once that report had been received, the Mandates Commission happily confirmed that they now knew that "no atrocities had been committed".

Most strikingly, the Mandates Commission agreed that aerial bombing of civilians, the very method they had condemned in the Bondelswarts case, was allowable when repressing a genuine rebellion.

The inconsistency of the Mandates Commission approach is clear. Was it inspired because the officials in charge in Syria were French and not "colonials"?

=== Conclusions ===
Like Hofmeyr, most of Hofmeyr's contemporaries also failed to understand the implications of the "new spirit" of the times as embodied in the League of Nations Covenant. When advocating in 1918 the new concept of a united world body, Smuts excluded the application of the scheme to Africa which he said is "inhabited by barbarians who not only cannot possibly govern themselves, but to whom it would be impracticable to apply any ideas of political self-determination in the European sense". Hofmeyr shared this view.

In Wellington's view, Hofmeyr's Administration was certainly better than the Germans in South West Africa and the British in Rhodesia. Wellington said that "one may regard South West Africa under the Germans and Rhodesia under Rhodes as amongst the last manifestations of rampant imperialism, the one inspired by Kaiser Wilhelm II, determined to secure its "place in the sun", the other by Cecil Rhodes determined at any cost to bring about the "furtherance of the British Empire, and the bringing of the whole civilised world under British rule".

For Wellington, Hofmeyr failed to "promote to the utmost the material and moral well-being and social progress of the inhabitants of the territory" as required under the Mandate. Wellington wrote that "one feels that positive policies of white supremacy or baasskap consort ill with the new voluntary acceptance of responsibility for the Black man's development. One wonders to what extent the disastrous first steps in the South West Africa Administration may be attributable to this fixed opinion about the worth and potential capacity of the indigenous African, and, perhaps, to a disappointment and resentment with regard to the League's non-annexation policy.

In his Report of 1922 Hofmeyr complains that the utmost difficulty was experienced in making the Herero realise that "vested interests" (of German and Union settlers) made it utterly impossible "at this late stage" to consider their request to restore their land. From this the Hofmeyr Administration's policy was crystal clear. So far as land was concerned the best must be kept for the whites; for the Natives the worst was good enough.

The adoption of a land policy which would be just to the Natives was surely of the utmost importance for the fulfilment of the "sacred trust", and legally required under the Mandate. Wellington's assessment is that failure in this at the very beginning was not merely a blunder, it was moral turpitude.

Ultimately, rather than focussing on Hofmeyr's use of warplanes and excessive force in inflicting a severe and lasting lesson on the Bondelswarts, history may judge Hofmeyr more harshly for the system that he introduced in South West Africa: his land policy, his promotion of white settlers at the expense of the Natives, his introduction of "ugly" laws aimed at reducing the Natives to a compliant labour force for the whites, and for the pass laws that restricted the movement and freedoms of the Natives.

== Sources ==
- Crawford, Neta (2002). Argument and Change in World Politics: Ethics, Decolonization and Humanitarian Intervention. Cambridge University Press.
- Debretts (1922). Peerage. Debrett's.
- Debrett's (1928). Peerage. Debrett's.
- de Bruijn, Mirjam (2007). Strength beyond Structure: Social and Historical Trajectories of Agency in Africa. Koninklijke Brill.
- Dewaldt, Franz (1976). Native Uprisings in Southwest Africa. Documentary Publications Salisbury, NC, USA.
- De Wet, N.J. (1921). Final Report of the Commission appointed to enquire into the question of the future form of Government in the South-West Protectorate (Report). Union of South Africa Government Printers.
- Elkins, Caroline (2022). Legacy of Violence: A History of the British Empire. The Bodley Head.
- Emmett, Anthony B. (1987). The Rise of African Nationalism in South West Africa/ Namibia 1915-1966. University of Witwatersrand doctoral dissertation, Johannesburg.
- Empire Parliamentary Association, UK Branch (23 July 1924). The Mandated Territory of South-West Africa. Empire Parliamentary Association (UK Branch).
- First, Ruth (1963). South West Africa. Penguin.
- Freislich, Richard (1964). The Last Tribal War. C. Struik, Cape Town.
- Goldblatt, I (1971). History of South West Africa. Juta & Company.
- Gregorowski, The Hon. Mr Justice (1914). Judicial Commission of Inquiry into the circumstances leading up to and attending upon the deaths of Senator General the Honourable J.H. de la Rey and Dr. G. Grace. Cape Times Limited, University of California Libraries.
- Hancock, W.K. (1962). Smuts: The Sanguine Years 1870-1919. Cambridge University Press.
- Hancock, W.K. (1968). "5 – Bulhoek and Bondelswarts". Smuts: The Fields of Force 1919-1950. Cambridge University Press.
- Hofmeyr, G.R. (1916). An Undivided White South Africa: The Ideal Union and how it may be achieved. T Maskew Miller, Cape Town.
- Hofmeyr, G.R. (1906). Het Zuid-Afrikaanse Jaarboek en Algemeene Gids.
- Hofmeyr, G.R. (12 April 1923). Memorandum in response to the Report of the Commission appointed to inquire into the Rebellion of the Bondelswarts. Cape Times.
- Hofmeyr, G.R. (1921). Memorandum of the Administrator of the Territory of South West Africa (Report). Administrator's Office.
- Hofmeyr, G.R. (1922). Union of South Africa: Territory of South-West Africa: Report of the Administrator for the year 1921. Union of South Africa Government Printing and Stationery Office.
- Hofmeyr, G.R. (1923). Union of South Africa: Report of the Administrator of South West Africa for the year 1922. Cape Times Limited, Government Printers.
- Hofmeyr, Jan Hendrik and Marsheille (2019). Hofmeyr: A Family History. J.H. Hofmeyr.
- Katjavivi, Peter H. (1988). "3 – The South African Takeover & the League of Nations Mandate". A History of Resistance in Namibia. Africa World Press, Inc.
- Lewis, Gavin L.M. (1977). The Bondelswarts Rebellion of 1922. Thesis for MA, Rhodes University.
- Minutes of the Fourth Session of the Permanent Mandates Commission held at Geneva from June 24th to July 8th, 1924, dated 16 July 1924.
- Newsinger, John (2006). The Blood Never Dried. Bookmarks.
- Official Report of the Governor-General of the Union of South Africa of his visit to the South West Territory in October 1919.
- Pedersen, Susan (2014). Internationalism and Empire: British Dilemmas 1919-1939. Ford Lectures, Oxford.
- Segal, Ronald; First, Ruth (1967). South West Africa: Travesty of Trust. Andre Deutsch.
- Soggott, David (1986). "3 – Sacred Trust". Namibia: the Violent Heritage. St Martin's Press, New York.
- Smuts, J.C. (1952). Jan Christian Smuts. Cassell & Co, Cape Town.
- Special Commission (1923). Report of the Commission appointed to enquire into the Rebellion of the Bondelzwarts. Union of South Africa.
- Strachan, Hew (2003). The First World War: Volume 1: To Arms. Oxford University Press, Oxford.
- Report on the Work of the Fourth Session of the Permanent Mandates Commission dated 16 July 1924, in South African National Archives, GR Hofmeyr Collection.
- Walker, Eric A. (1959). A History of Southern Africa. Longmans.
- Walker, Eric A. (1968). Review of Smuts Volume 1 and II by WK Hancock. The Historical Journal (Vol 11, No 3 (1968, pp565-581 ed.). Cambridge University Press.
- Wallace, Marion (2014). "8 – South African Rule 1915-46". History of Namibia: From the Beginning to 1990. Oxford University Press.
- Walton, Edgar H. (1912). The Inner History of the National Convention of South Africa. T. Maskew Miller, Cape Town.
- Wellington, John H. (1967). South West Africa and its Human Issues. Oxford Clarendon Press.
- Werner, Wolfgang (1998). No One will become Rich: Economy and Society in the Herero Reserves in Namibia. P Schlettwein Publishing.
- White, Jon Manchip (1969). The Land God Made in Anger. Rand McNally & Company.
