= Dantès Bellegarde =

Haitian historian and diplomat (1877–1966)

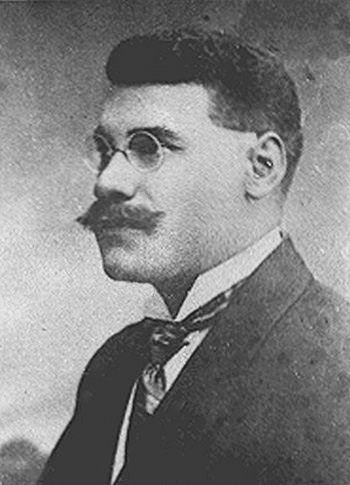
Dantès Bellegarde

Dantès Bellegarde (18 May 1877 – 16 June 1966) was a Haitian historian and diplomat. He is best known for his works Histoire du Peuple Haïtien (1953), La Résistance Haïtienne (1937), Haïti et ses Problèmes (1943), and Pour une Haïti Heureuse (1928–1929).

== Early years ==
Bellegarde was born in Port-au-Prince to a poor mulatto family. His impoverished but small bourgeoisie background descended from several historical figures in Haiti's history. His maternal great-grandfather Jacques Ignace-Fresnal was an officer in the army and Haiti's first Minister of Justice, and founder of Haitian Freemasonry. His paternal grandfather, General Jean-Louis Bellegarde, was a former Governor of Port-au-Prince.

The Second Pan-African Congress proposed that Bellegarde be added as a member of the Permanent Mandates Commission, but the colonial powers that dominated the Commission did not name him to the Commission.

He was an Assembly delegate for Haiti. On 8 September 1922, Bellegarde highlighted a massacre of the Bondelswarts (a poor pastoral tribe) in South West Africa, which was a League mandate at the time.

Bellegarde was part of a panel of experts on the League of Nations's Temporary Commission on Slavery in 1924. It was the first time that the League of Nations had a black person as an expert on a commission. On the commission, Bellegarde was the strongest critic of colonialism and forced labor.

== Career ==
Bellegarde served as Minister Plenipotentiary to Paris in 1921 and to Washington, D.C., in 1930.

== Honours ==
He was bestowed by France as commander of the Legion of Honour and was holder of the Office of Public Instruction.
