= List of companies of Botswana =

Location of Botswana

Botswana is a landlocked country located in Southern Africa. A mid-sized country of just over 2 million people, Botswana is one of the most sparsely populated nations in the world. Around 10 percent of the population lives in the capital and largest city, Gaborone. Formerly one of the poorest countries in the world—with a GDP per capita of about US$70 per year in the late 1960s—Botswana has since transformed itself into one of the fastest-growing economies in the world. The economy is dominated by mining, cattle, and tourism. Botswana boasts a GDP (purchasing power parity) per capita of about $18,825 per year as of 2015, which is one of the highest in Africa. Its high gross national income (by some estimates the fourth-largest in Africa) gives the country a modest standard of living and the highest Human Development Index of continental Sub-Saharan Africa.

== Notable firms ==
This list includes notable companies with primary headquarters located in the country. The industry and sector follow the Industry Classification Benchmark taxonomy. Organizations which have ceased operations are included and noted as defunct.

Notable companies Status: P=Private, S=State; A=Active, D=Defunct
Name	Industry	Sector	Headquarters	Founded	Notes	Status	
Air Botswana	Consumer services	Airlines	Gaborone	1972	State airline	S	A
BancABC	Financials	Banks	Gaborone	1997	Financial services	P	A
Bank of Botswana	Financials	Banks	Gaborone	1975	Central bank	S	A
BotswanaPost	Industrials	Delivery services	Gaborone	1989	Postal services	S	A
Botswana Guardian	Consumer services	Publishing	Gaborone	1982	Newspaper	P	A
Botswana Meat Commission	Consumer goods	Food products	Lobatse	1965	Meat	S	A
Botswana Power Corporation	Utilities	Conventional electricity	Gaborone	1970		S	A
Botswana Railways	Industrials	Railroads	Gaborone	1987	Railway	S	A
Botswana Stock Exchange	Financials	Investment services	Gaborone	1995	Exchange	P	A
Botswana Telecommunications Corporation	Telecommunications	Fixed line telecommunications	Gaborone	1980	Telco	P	A
Botswana TV	Consumer services	Broadcasting & entertainment	Gaborone	1997	Television	S	A
Choppies	Consumer services	Broadline retailers	Gaborone	1986	Retail and grocery	P	A
Debswana	Basic materials	Diamonds & gemstones	Gaborone	1969	Diamonds and coal	P	A
Letshego	Financials	Specialty finance	Gaborone	1998	Financial services, microfinance	P	A
Mack Air	Consumer services	Airlines	Maun	1994	Charter airline	P	A
Mascom	Telecommunications	Mobile telecommunications	Gaborone	1998	Mobile network	P	A
Mmegi	Consumer services	Publishing	Gaborone	1984	Newspaper	P	A
Motor Company of Botswana	Consumer goods	Automobiles	Gaborone	1992	Automotive, defunct 2001	P	D
The Botswana Gazette	Consumer services	Publishing	Gaborone	1984	Newspaper	P	A
The Voice	Consumer services	Publishing	Francistown	1993	Newspaper	P	A
Water Utilities Corporation	Utilities	Water	Francistown	1970	Water	S	A
Wilderness Air	Consumer services	Airlines	Maun	1991	Charter airline	P	A

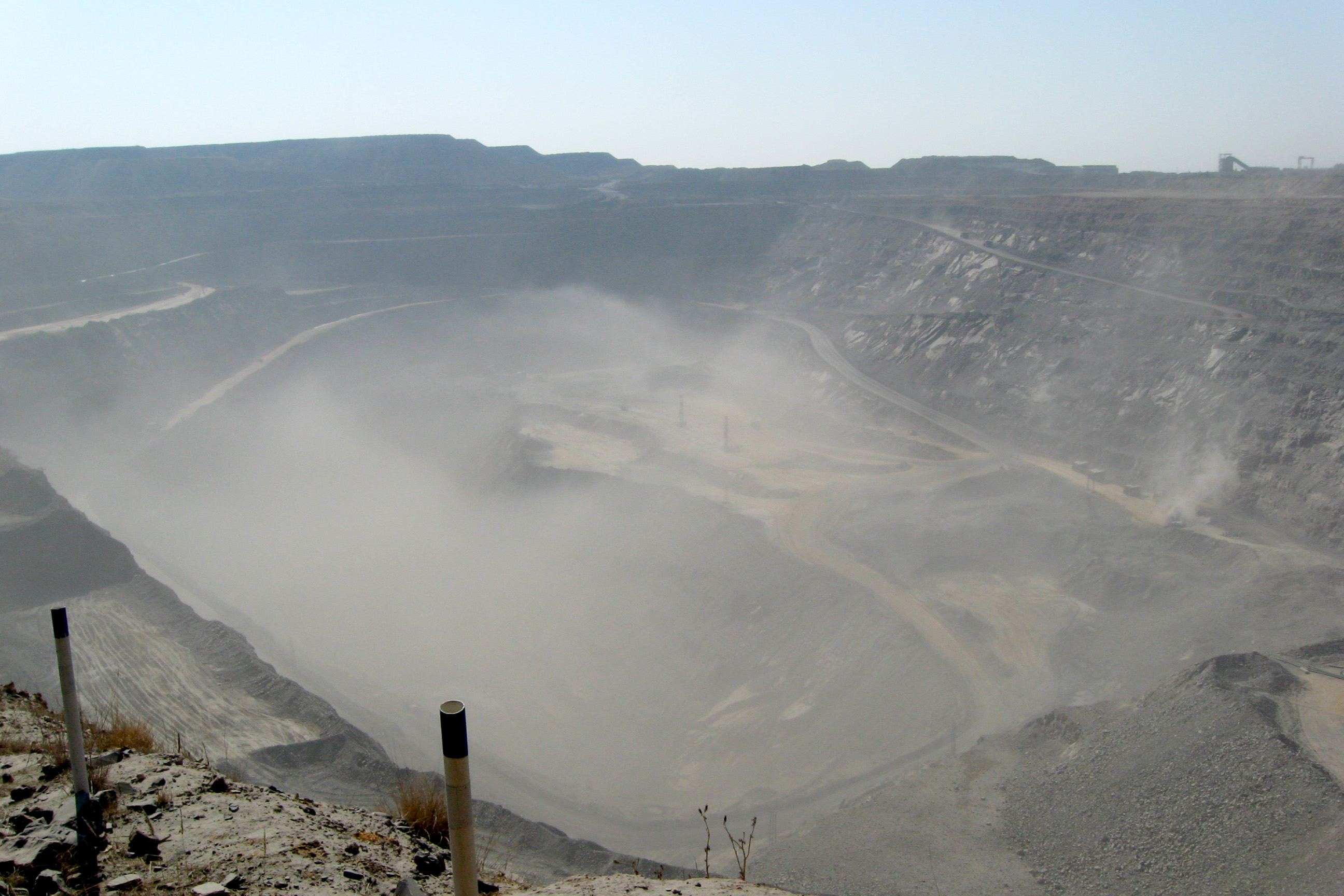
The Jwaneng diamond mine is the richest in the world today.

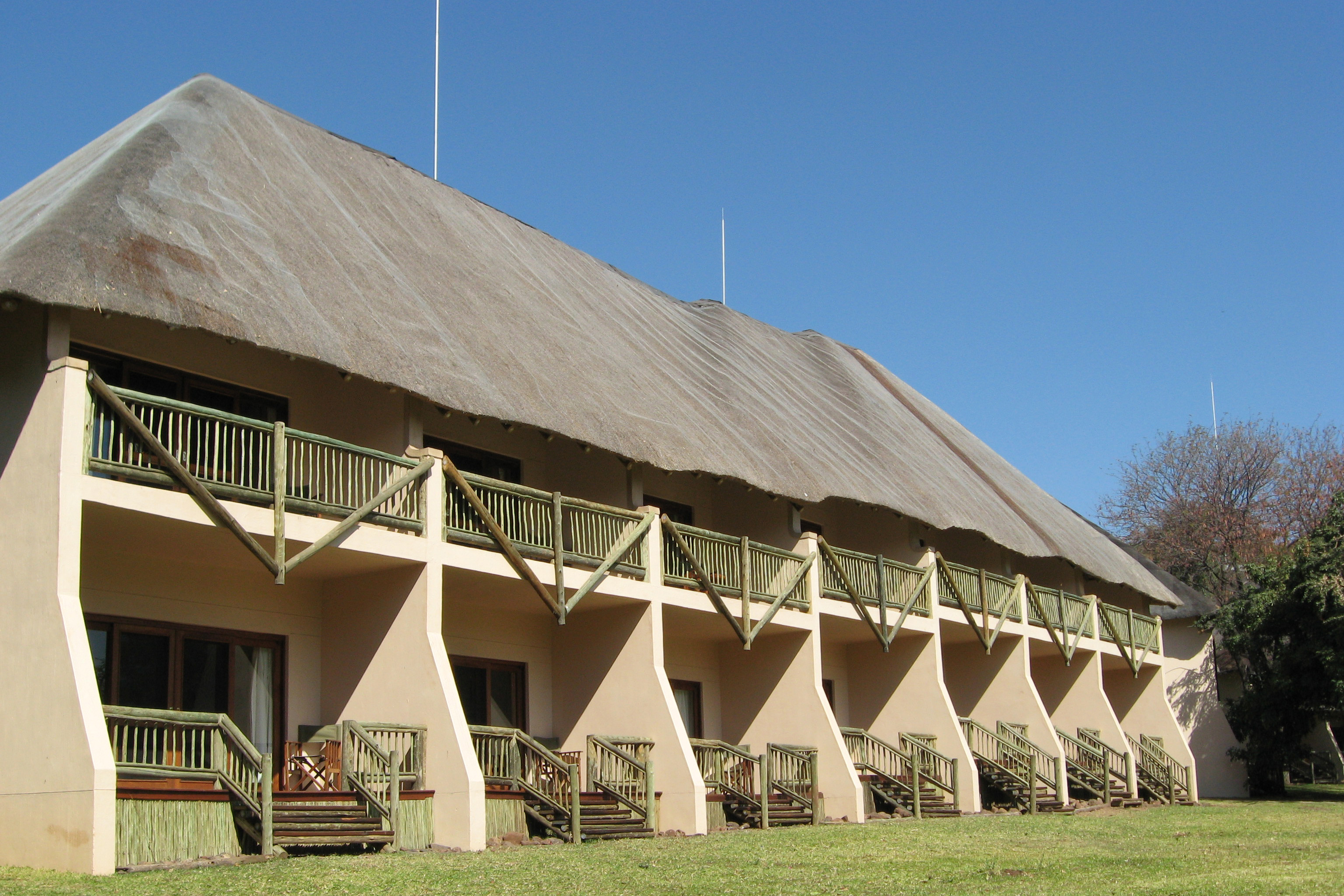
Tourist resort at Kasane

== See also ==
- Economy of Botswana
- List of companies in Gaborone
- List of Botswana-related topics
