= List of companies in Gaborone =

The following is a list of companies based in Gaborone, Botswana

== Banks ==
- ABN AMRO
- ABN AMRO Outside Banking Unit
- BancABC
- Bank of Baroda
- Bank Gaborone
- Barclays Bank
- Capital Bank
- First National Bank of Botswana
- Stanbic Bank
- Standard Chartered Bank
- Bank of India

== Basic materials ==
- Debswana, diamonds and coal

== Consumer goods ==
- Botswana Meat Commission
- Kgalagadi Breweries Limited
- Sechaba Brewery Holdings

== Consumer services ==
- Choppies
- Shoprite
- Woolworths Foods

== Financials ==
- BancABC, financial services
- Bank of Botswana, central bank
- Letshego Holdings Limited
- Botswana Stock Exchange

== Industrials ==
- Botswana Railways, railway

== Media ==
- The Botswana Gazette, newspaper
- Botswana Guardian, newspaper
- Botswana TV, television
- Mmegi, newspaper

== Telecommunications ==
- Botswana Telecommunications Corporation
- Orange Botswana
- Mascom
- GCSat

== Travel & leisure ==
- Air Botswana, airline
- Mack Air, charter airline
- Wilderness Air, charter airline

== Utilities ==
- Botswana Power Corporation
- Water Utilities Corporation (Botswana)

== See also ==
- Economy of Botswana
