= Mining industry of Botswana =

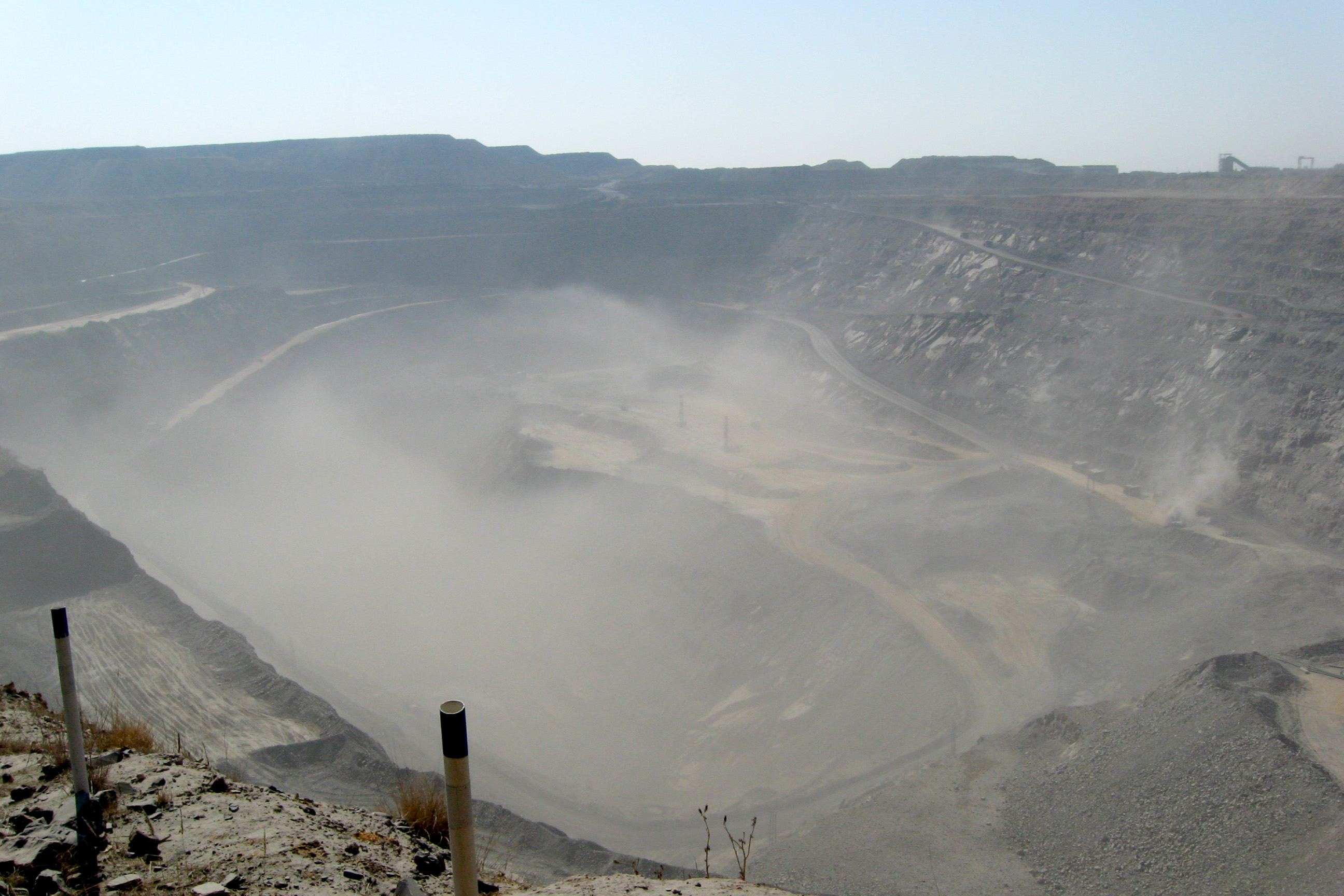
The Jwaneng diamond mine, the second largest in the world, and richest by value.

The mining industry of Botswana has dominated the national economy of Botswana since the 1970s, being a primary sector industry. Diamond has been the leading component of the mineral sector ever since production of gems started being extracted by the mining company Debswana. Most of Botswana's diamond production is of gem quality, resulting in the country's position as the world's leading producer of diamond by value. Copper, gold, nickel, coal and soda ash production also has held significant, though smaller, roles in the economy.

In 2022, mining accounted for about 16% of Botswana's real gross domestic product (GDP). Most of Botswana’s mineral industry consists of diamonds. Beyond diamonds, Botswana also boasts abundant mineral resources such as coal, copper, nickel, and soda ash, along with granite, further diversifying its mining sector. However, this sector, despite being very important, faces challenges, mainly due to lack of infrastructure development.

== Diamonds ==
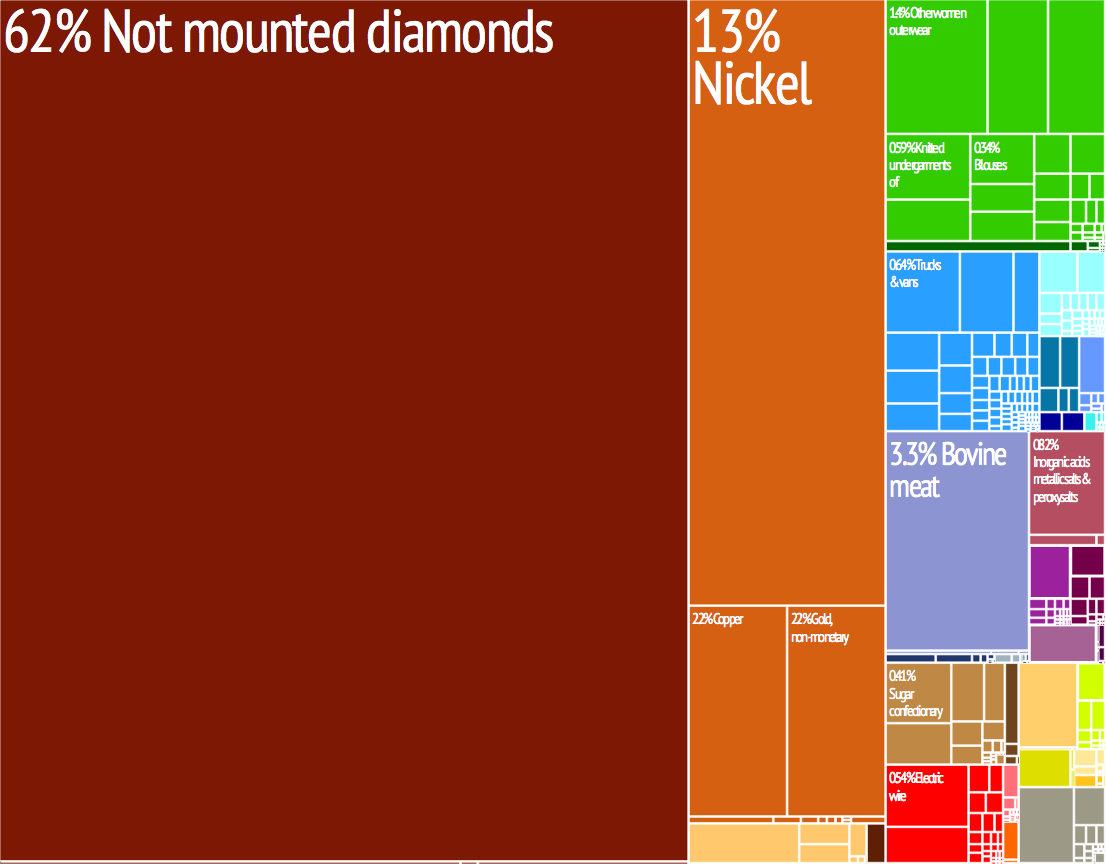
Tree map of Botswana’s exports in 2009

Botswana's diamond industry is very important to its economy. Since the discovery of diamonds in Botswana in the late 1960s in the Orapa diamond mine, these precious gemstones have played a very important role in shaping the nation's economics. The industry is mainly managed by the government and De Beers in a company called Debswana.

=== Economic impact of diamonds ===
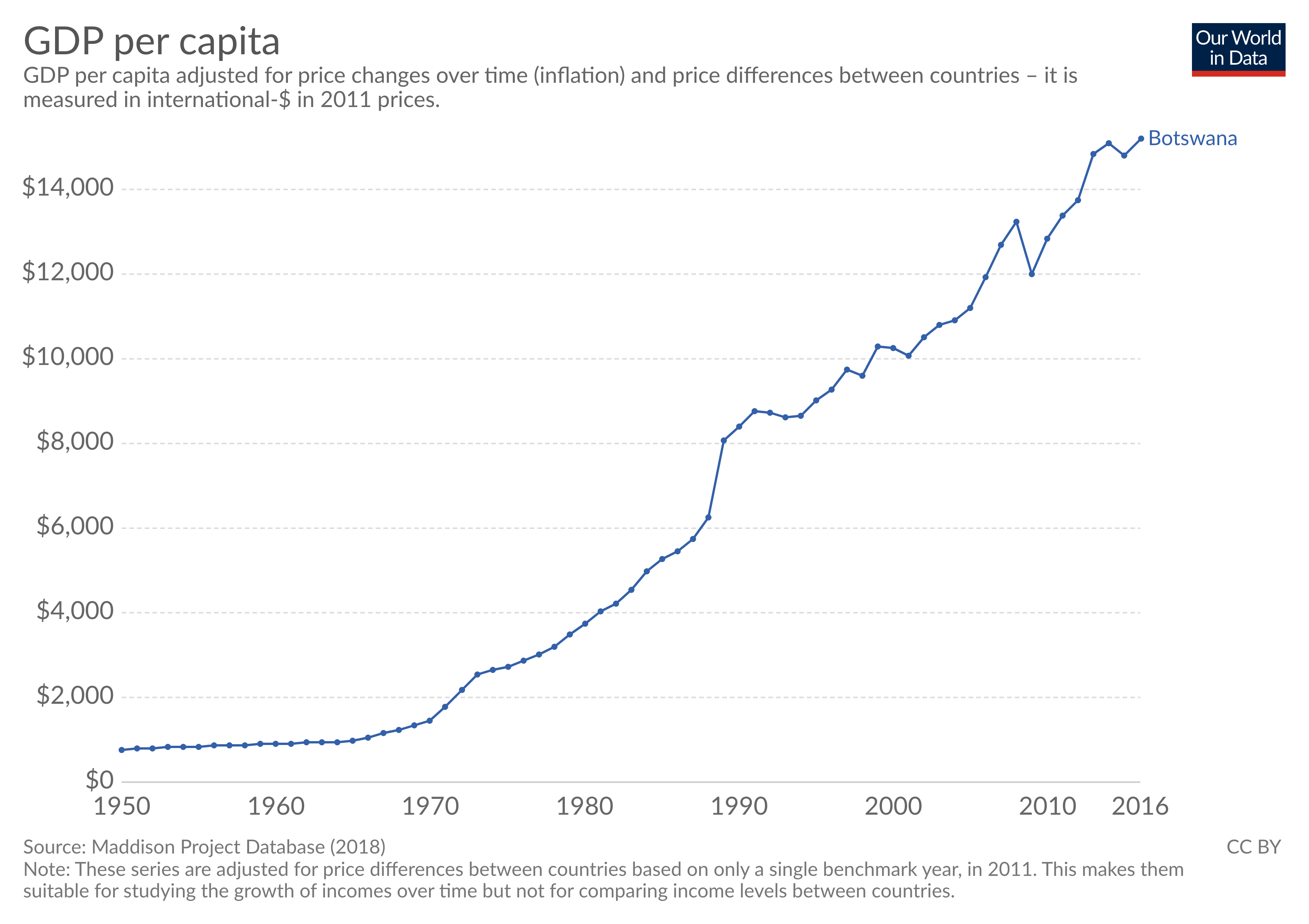
GDP per capita of Botswana from 1950 to 2016

Diamonds have had a large impact on Botswana's economy. The discovery of diamonds in Botswana during the 1960s triggered a global notable economic transformation, elevating the country from one of the poorest in the world to an economically wealthy country in Africa.

Revenue from diamond exports has enabled Botswana to invest in infrastructure, education, healthcare, and social welfare programs, which has been an extremely significant contributor to the standard of living for its citizens. Additionally, Botswana has implemented policies to promote local beneficiation, encouraging the cutting and polishing of diamonds within the country to capture more value from the industry. With its rich diamond reserves, its commitment to sustainability, and partnerships, Botswana has been significant in the diamond industry.

=== Debswana ===
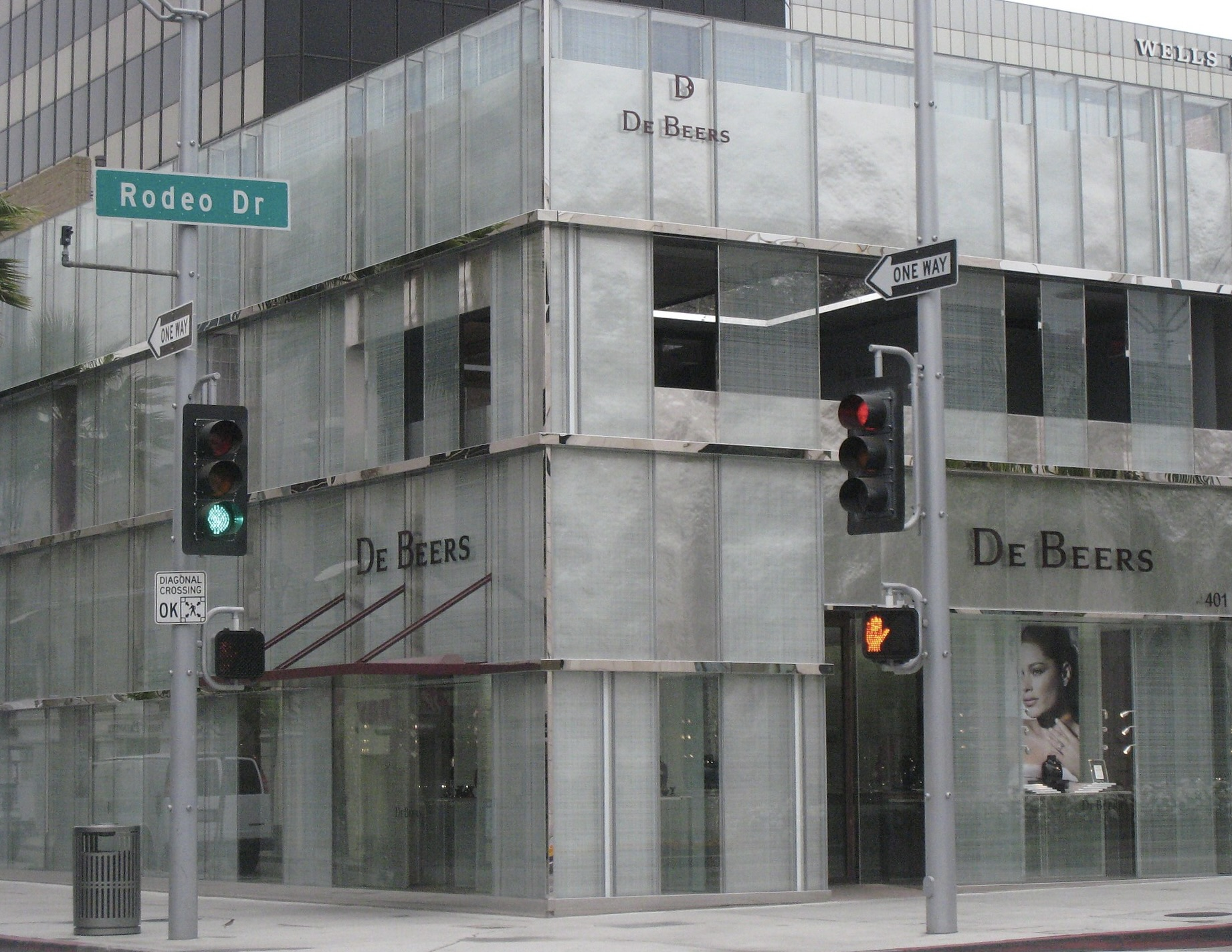
De Beers store in Beverly Hills, California.

Debswana, established in 1969, is a mining company jointly owned by the Government of Botswana and the De Beers Group. It operates diamond mines in Botswana. However, Debswana has faced controversy over its labor practices, environmental impact, along with concerns about worker safety.

It operates four major diamond mines in Botswana, being Jwaneng, Orapa, Letlhakane, and Damtshaa, so Debswana is considered to be crucial in the country's diamond production.

== Other commodities ==
Botswana has substantial coal reserves, primarily located in the eastern region of the country, particularly in the Mmamabula coalfields. The development of coal mining, the Morupule Colliery, has enabled Botswana to use its coal resources for both domestic consumption and exportation. However, challenges such as environmental concerns have made it so that trade and exports are limited and usually with neighboring countries. The country's gold reserves are mainly concentrated in the eastern regions, particularly in areas such as the Tati Greenstone Belt. Exploration efforts by both local and international mining companies have led to the discovery of significant gold deposits. Botswana has substantial copper deposits mainly located in The Kalahari Copper Belt. The Kalahari Copper Belt, in particular, is a prominent geological formation known for its copper-rich ore bodies. However, the commercial viability of copper mining in Botswana depends on factors like market demand. Nickel mining in Botswana represents a burgeoning sector with considerable potential for growth and investment. The discovery of nickel deposits in the northeastern parts of the country, notably in the Selebi-Phikwe region, has started to bring more economic opportunity in this sector. The development of nickel mining infrastructure, such as processing plants and transportation networks, is crucial for Botswana’s nickel industry.

== Political influence ==
=== San people ===
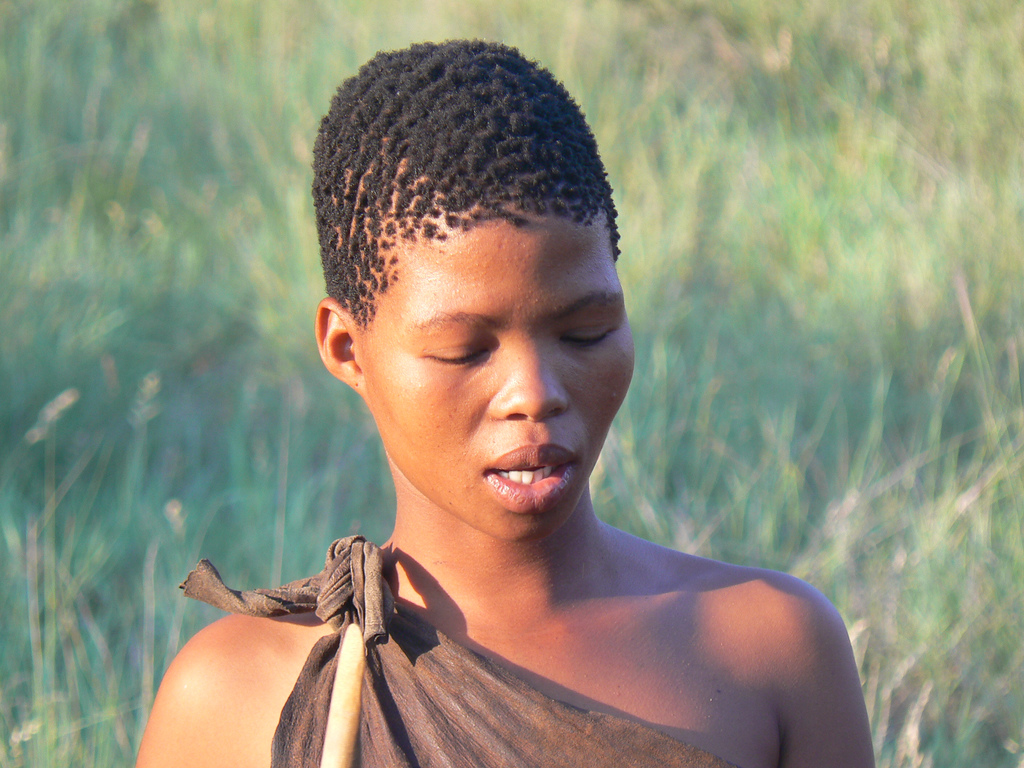
San woman in Botswana

In the late 20th century and the early 21st century, the indigenous San people were forcibly relocated from their home for diamond companies to start exploring in order to find diamonds. Their lands are located in the world’s richest diamond field. However, the government denies that there is any relation with mining and claims the relocation is to preserve the wildlife and ecosystem.

=== Environmental impact ===
Mining activities in Botswana, particularly in diamond extraction, have raised concerns about their environmental impact. Climate change is a serious issue for a water scarce country like Botswana. The process of mining, including land clearing, excavation, and waste disposal, can lead to habitat destruction, soil erosion, and water pollution.
