= Letlhakane =

- Village
- Nickname: Zowa
- Location within Botswana
- Coordinates: 21°25′S 25°35′E
- Country: Botswana
- District: Central District
- Elevation: 997 m (3,271 ft)

Population (2011)
  - Total: 20,841
- Time zone: GMT +2

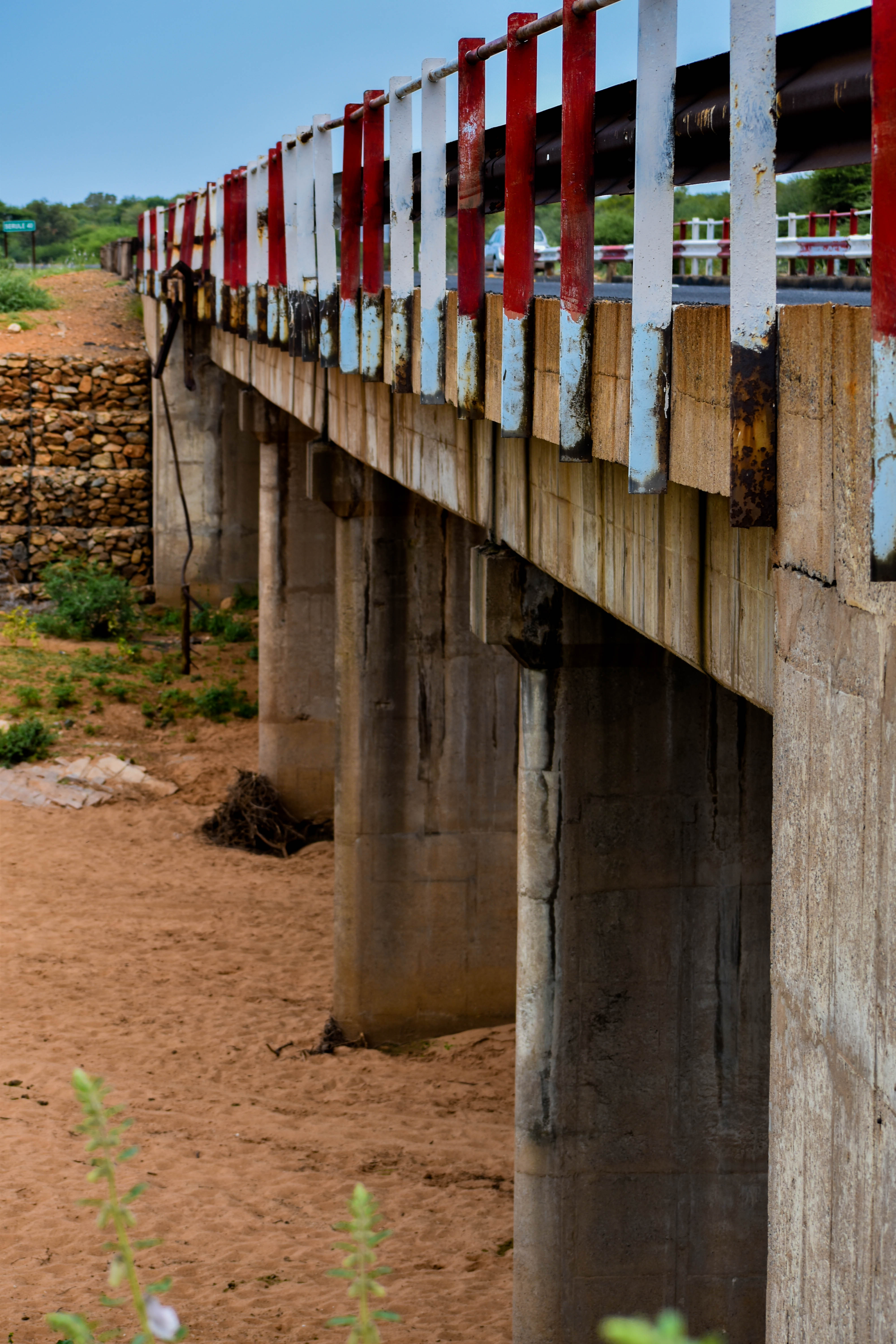
Letlhakane bridge

Letlhakane is a village in the Central District of Botswana. Letlhakane is the headquarters of the Boteti sub-district. It is located south of Mmatshumo and the population of the village was 22,911 in 2011 census.

It is a Village with diverse culture of different tribal groups which gave its name . The major tribe is Bakhurutshe whose totem is Kgama/ phofu. Other groups include Bangwato, Bakalanga, Basarwa and Baherero.

Within 15–20 km of Letlhakane are four diamond mines. Three of the mines are operated by Debswana: Letlhakane mine in south-east, Orapa in north-west and Damtshaa in north. The other is operated by Boteti Mining (Karowe diamond mine) located in the south-west of the village. Boteti Mining is owned by Lucara Diamonds

The Botswana Prison Service (BPS) operates the Letlhakane Prison.

== Education ==
Letlhakane is home to one (1) senior secondary school; Letlhakane Senior Secondary School. The two junior schools found in Letlhakane are Ditsweletse Community Junior Secondary School and Motsumi Community Junior Secondary School. There are five (6) primary schools in Letlhakane, namely, Mokane Primary School, Letlhakane Primary School, Retlhatloleng Primary School, Seaseole Primary School, Supang Memorial Primary School and Zantete Primary School( new school)
