= Economy of Botswana =

- Masa Square Central Business District
- Currency: Pula (BWP, P)
- Fiscal year: 1 April – 31 March
- Trade organisations: AU, SADC, SACU, WTO, UN
- Country group: Developing/Emerging; Upper-middle income economy

Statistics
- Population: ▲2,630,296 (2022)
- GDP: ▲$19.19 billion (nominal; 2025); ▲$52.65 billion (PPP; 2025)
- GDP rank: 129th (nominal; 2025); 133rd (PPP; 2025)
- GDP growth: ▲2.3% (2026f)
- GDP per capita: ▲$6,940 (nominal; 2025); ▲$19,050 (PPP; 2025)
- GDP per capita rank: 99th (nominal; 2025); 97th (PPP; 2025)
- GDP per capita growth: -4.6% (2024)
- GDP by sector: agriculture: 1.8%; industry: 27.5%; services: 70.6%; (2017 est.)
- Inflation (CPI): 4% (2024 est.)
- Population below national poverty line: 16.3% (2016); 60.4% on less than $5.50/day (2015)
- Gini coefficient: 45.5 medium (2016)
- Human Development Index: ▲0.731 high (2023)
- Labour force: ▲1,107,235 (2019); 55.7% employment rate (2013)
- Unemployment: 23.4% (2023)
- Main industries: diamonds, copper, nickel, salt, soda ash, potash, coal, iron ore, silver; beef processing; textiles

External
- Exports: ▲$8.9 billion (2022 est.)
- Export goods: diamonds, copper, nickel, soda ash, beef, textiles
- Main export partners: India 21%; Belgium 19%; United Arab Emirates 19%; South Africa 9%; Israel 7%; Hong Kong 6%; Singapore 5%; (2019)
- Imports: ▼$8.7 billion (2022 est.)
- Import goods: foodstuffs, machinery, electrical goods, transport equipment, textiles, fuel and petroleum products, wood and paper products, metal and metal products
- Main import partners: South Africa 58%; Namibia 9%; Canada 7%; (2019)
- FDI stock: ▼$5.319 billion (31 December 2017 est.); ▲ Abroad: $1.973 billion (31 December 2017 est.)
- Current account: ▲$606.394 million (2022 est.)
- Gross external debt: ▼$2.187 billion (31 December 2017 est.)

Public finance
- Government debt: ▼19.62% of GDP (2022 est.)
- Foreign reserves: ▼$4.279 billion (2022 est.)
- Budget balance: −1% (of GDP) (2017 est.)
- Revenue: 5.305 billion (2017 est.)
- Spending: 5.478 billion (2017 est.)
- Economic aid: $96.43 million (2021)
- Credit rating: Standard & Poor's: BBB- (2026)
- All values, unless otherwise stated, are in US dollars.

Botswana has a developing economy considered upper-middle income. Growth in private sector employment averaged about 10% per annum during the first 30 years of the country's independence. After a period of stagnation at the turn of the 21st century, Botswana's economy registered strong levels of growth, with GDP growth exceeding 6–7% targets. Economic growth since the late 1960s has been on par with some of Asia's largest economies. The government has consistently maintained budget surpluses and has extensive foreign-exchange reserves.

Botswana's relative economic growth compared to some of its neighbors has been built on a foundation of diamond mining, prudent fiscal policies, and a cautious foreign policy. Botswana's economy is largely dependent on diamond mining. Diamond mining contributes to 50% of the government revenue mainly through its 50:50 joint venture with De Beers in the Debswana Diamond Company. Lab-grown diamonds has led to a significant decrease in worldwide demand for mined diamonds beginning in the early 2020s. The resulting reduction in the value of diamond exports prompted the IMF to forecast Botswana to run a fiscal deficit of 11%, and the Botswana ministry of finance to forecast negative GDP growth for the country in 2025. As of 2020, Botswana is rated as the third least corrupt country in Africa in the Corruption Perceptions Index by international corruption watchdog Transparency International. It has the fourth highest gross national income per capita in purchasing power in Africa and above the world average.

Trade unions represent a minority of workers in the Botswana economy. In general they are loosely organised "in-house" unions, although the Botswana Federation of Trade Unions (BFTU) is consolidating its role as the sole national trade union centre in the country. Botswana's overreliance on mining and its high rate of HIV/AIDS infection (one in every five adults is seropositive) and unemployment may threaten its future success. Botswana has become the first high-burden country to be certified for achieving an important milestone on the path to eliminating mother-to-child transmission of HIV by the World Health Organization (WHO).

== History ==
Agriculture still provides a livelihood for 70% of the rural population but supplies only about 50% of food needs and accounted for only 1.8% of GDP as of 2016. Subsistence farming and cattle raising predominate. The sector is plagued by erratic rainfall and poor soils. Diamond mining and tourism are also important to the economy. Substantial mineral deposits were found in the 1970s and the mining sector grew from 25% of GDP in 1980 to 38% in 1998.

Economic growth slowed in 2005–2008 and turned negative in 2009 as a result of the Great Recession, contracting by 5.2%. This was exacerbated by a major global downturn in the industrial sector, which shrank by 30%, Botswana's steep economic downturn contrasted with most other African nations which experienced continued growth through this period.

== Macroeconomic trend ==
=== Main indicators ===
The following table shows the main economic indicators in 1980-2026. Inflation below 5% is in green.

Year	GDP			GDP growth (real)	Inflation (%)	Government debt (% of GDP)
Year	Total (bil. US$ PPP)	Per capita (US$ PPP)	Total (bil. US$ nominal)	GDP growth (real)	Inflation (%)	Government debt (% of GDP)
1980	1.9	n/a	1.2	12.0	12.1	n/a
1985	4.0	n/a	1.1	7.7	8.1	n/a
1990	8.1	n/a	3.8	8.8	11.4	n/a
1995	10.9	n/a	4.8	8.5	10.5	n/a
2000	14.4	n/a	5.7	4.3	8.5	8.2
2005	19.9	n/a	9.8	5.0	8.6	7.5
2006	21.8	n/a	9.9	6.0	11.6	6.1
2007	23.7	n/a	10.6	5.8	7.1	5.9
2008	24.9	n/a	10.7	3.3	12.6	7.8
2009	21.5	n/a	10.1	-14.1	8.1	22.4
2010	24.0	n/a	12.6	10.1	6.9	26.5
2011	26.2	n/a	15.1	6.8	8.5	27.9
2012	26.6	n/a	13.9	-0.2	7.5	26.4
2013	30.0	n/a	14.3	11.1	5.9	23.8
2014	32.3	n/a	15.5	5.7	4.4	23.9
2015	31.0	n/a	13.5	-4.9	3.1	24.5
2016	33.6	n/a	15.1	7.2	2.8	22.3
2017	35.6	n/a	16.1	4.1	3.3	19.6
2018	36.3	n/a	17.0	4.2	3.2	19.6
2019	37.2	n/a	16.7	3.0	2.7	21.5
2020	36.1	n/a	14.9	-8.7	1.9	23.5
2021	43.1	n/a	18.8	11.9	6.7	22.3
2022	48.7	n/a	20.3	5.5	12.2	21
2023	52.2	n/a	19.4	3.2	5.1	22.5
2024	51.9	n/a	19.4	-3.0	2.8	33.2
2025	52.9	n/a	19.5	-0.9	2.8	38.6
2026	56.9	n/a	21.9	4.7	5.1	47

== Sectors ==
=== Agriculture ===
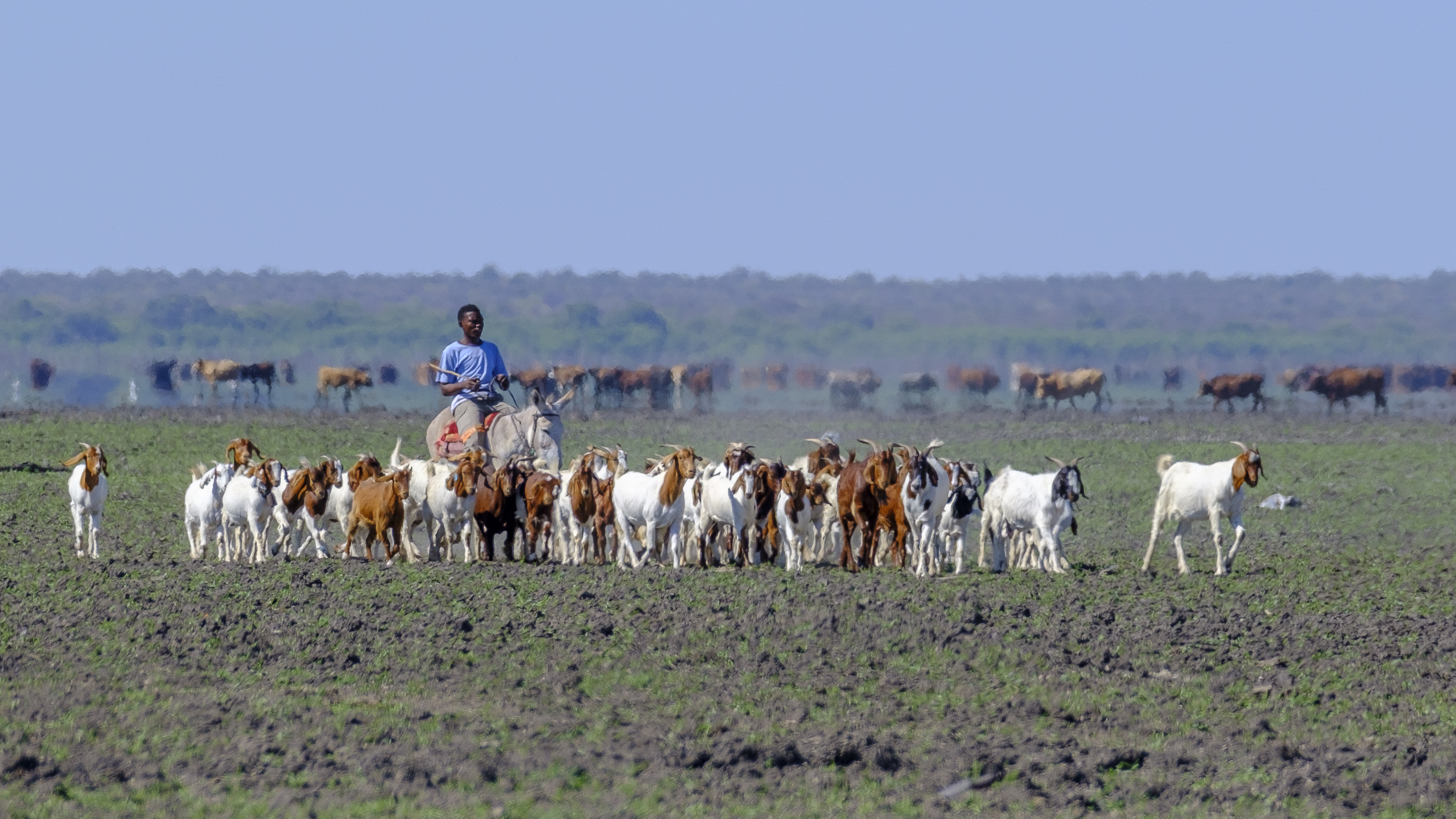
Man on donkey herding goats in a dry river bed

More than half of Botswana's population lives in rural areas and depends on subsistence crops and livestock farming. Agriculture meets only a small portion of food needs and contributes just 1.8% of Botswana's GDP as of 2017, according to the CIA World Factbook. 2024 estimates stated that it was still less than 2% of Botswana's GDP. Cattle raising dominated Botswana's social and economic life before independence. The Botswana Meat Commission (BMC) has a monopoly on beef production, however in late 2023, it ended. The national herd was about 2.5 million in the mid-1990s, though the 1995 government-ordered slaughter of the entire herd in Botswana's north-west Ngamiland District, to prevent the spread of "cattle lung disease" to other parts of the country, reduced the number by at least 200,000.

Botswana produced, in 2018:

- 102 thousand tons of root and tubers;
- 46 thousand tons of vegetables;
- 17 thousand tons of sorghum;
- 13 thousand tons of maize;
- 8 thousand tons of cabbage;
- 6 thousand tons of onion;
- 5 thousand tons of tomato;

In addition to smaller productions of other agricultural products.

=== Mining ===
Two large mining companies, Debswana (formed by the government and South Africa's De Beers in equal partnership) and Bamangwato Concessions, Ltd. (BCL, also with substantial government equity participation) operate in the country. BCL was placed in provisional liquidation in late 2016, following years of loss-making operations, and was placed into final liquidation by the High Court in June 2017.

==== Diamonds and other gems ====
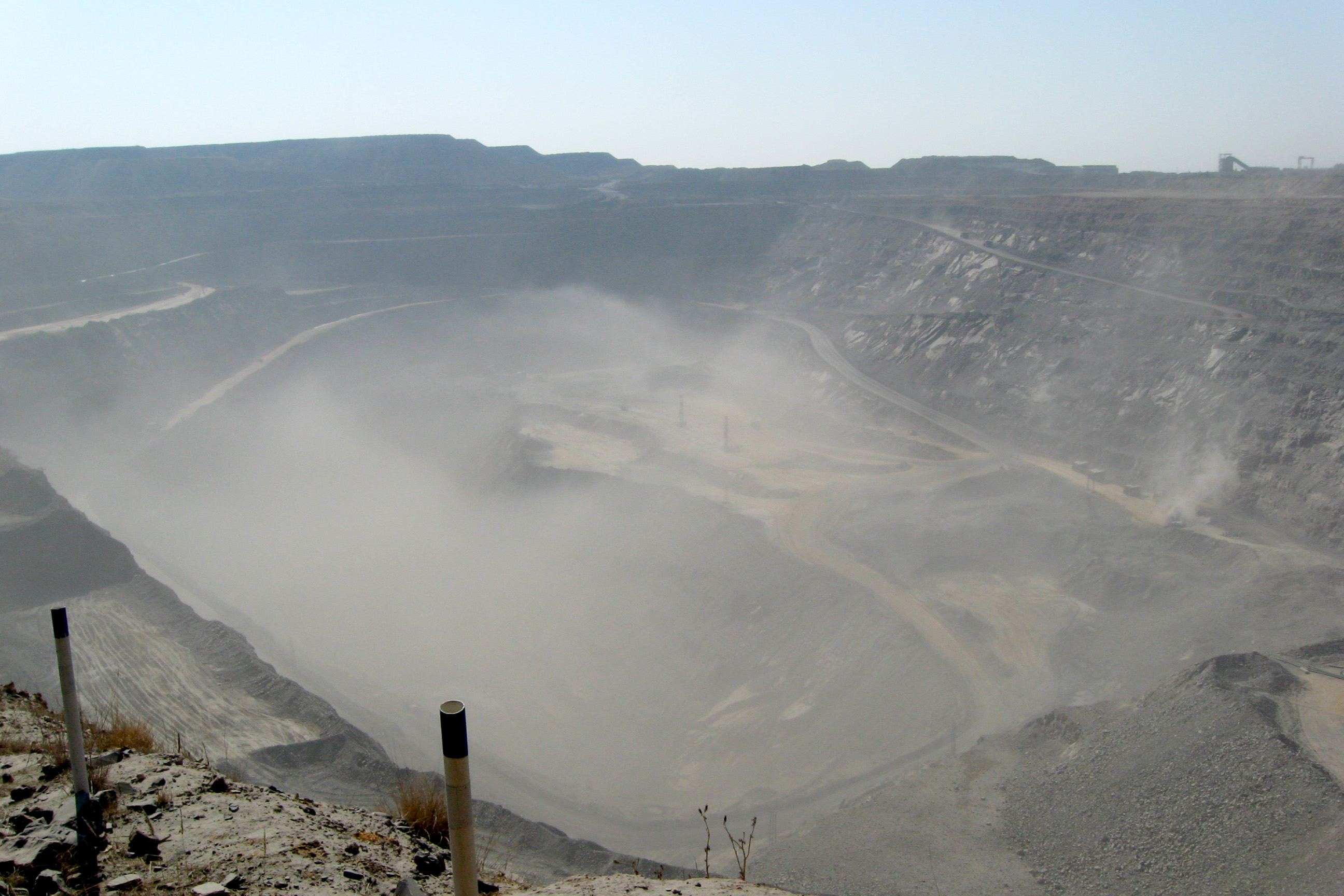
The Jwaneng diamond mine is the second biggest in the world today.

Since early 1980s, the country has been one of the world's largest producers of gem diamonds. Eight large diamond mines have opened since Botswana's independence. De Beers prospectors discovered diamonds in northern Botswana in the early 1970s. The first mine began production at Orapa in 1972, followed by a smaller mine at Letlhakane. What has become the single-richest diamond mine in the world opened in Jwaneng in 1982. The mine was discovered when termites looking for water brought grains of diamond to the surface. Botswana produced a total of 24 million carats of diamonds from Debswana in 2022, and is the highest producer of diamonds by value in the world as of 2023. The Orapa 2000 Expansion of the existing Orapa mine was opened in 2000. According to Debswana, the Orapa 2000 Expansion project increase the Orapa's mine annual output from 6 million carats to 12 million carats and raised total production to 26 million carats. In 2003, Debswana opened the Damtshaa diamond mine about 220 kilometers (140 mi) west of the city of Francistown. The mine was placed into care and maintenance in December 2015 due to weak global demand but was scheduled to reopen in January 2018. In 2008, Australia's Kimberley Diamond Company opened a mine in Lerala, Botswana's fifth mine and the first not operated by Debswana. However, Kimberley shut down the mine in May 2017, citing weak market conditions.

Most of Botswana's electricity is imported from South Africa's Eskom. Debswana operates the nearby Morupule Colliery to supply coal to it. Botswana exported $3.12k worth of electricity from 2021 to 2022, all going to Zimbabwe. In early 2008, the entire southern African region was hit hard by massive shortages of power, since the region works to share its power resources through the Southern African Power Pool, with most of its capacity coming from South Africa. Botswana has in turn put in place plans to become a net exporter of power to the regional pool, through governmental expansion of the Morupule power station, as well as encouraging private investment in the form of a 4 gigawatt power station by the Canadian greenfield company CIC Energy. In 2012, CIC Energy was acquired by India's Jindal Steel and Power. Jindal Africa currently aims to operate three surface mines in the coalfields of Mmamabula, as well as a power plant. According to the company, "the mine’s development will meet the demands of 600MW power stations and export region coal markets, with the potential to employ more than 2,000 people."

Botswana also produces soda ash through Botash, a joint venture between the government and South Africa's Chlor-Alkali Holdings (CAH) Group. Botash has been operating in the Sua Pan in northeastern Botswana since April 1991.

=== Tourism ===
Tourism is an increasingly important industry in Botswana, accounting for approximately 13.1% of GDP in 2019. However, As of February 2024, it was reported to be less than 10%. One of the world's unique ecosystems, the Okavango Delta, is located in Botswana. The country offers game viewing and birding both in the Delta and in the Chobe National Park—home to one of the largest herds of free-ranging elephants in the world. Botswana's Central Kalahari Game Reserve also offers game viewing and some of the remotest and most unspoiled wilderness in southern Africa.

A number of national parks and game reserves, with their abundant wildlife and wetlands, are major tourist attractions.

The main safari destinations for tourism are Moremi Game Reserve in the Okavango Delta, and Chobe National Park. Botswana is also participating in community-based natural resource management projects by trying to involve villagers in tourism. One example is the village of Khwai and its Khwai Development Trust.

Botswana was the setting for the 1980 movie The Gods Must Be Crazy, although the movie was mostly filmed in South Africa. The seventh season of The Amazing Race visited Botswana. Tourism has been stimulated by the series of detective novels by Alexander McCall Smith and the American dramatisation that followed them.

=== Manufacturing ===
Manufacturing industries in Botswana include food processing, predominantly beef processing, diamond processing, textile and garment manufacturing, beverage making, jewellery making, metals and metal products, soap making, construction materials manufacturing, and glass production.

Manufacturing has potential growth, however, accounting for roughly 5% of the nation's gross domestic product. Over the years, there has been a notable decline in the role of the manufacturing sector in the national economy. The reason for this can be pinned to a number of factors, the main ones being lack of skills, failing to keep up with the latest technology, lack of competitiveness along with bad marketing techniques.

=== Science and technology ===
There is a growing science sector in Botswana. The number of publications by Botswanan scientists catalogued in international databases increased from 133 in 2009 to 210 in 2014. In 2018, Botswana produced 281 scientific and technical journal articles. The country has one of the highest levels of scientific productivity in Sub-Saharan Africa. The country also has a high-tech industry, being home to a number of information technology companies. In 2022, Botswana's high-tech exports were worth about $38 million.

=== Transport ===
Rail network map of Botswana

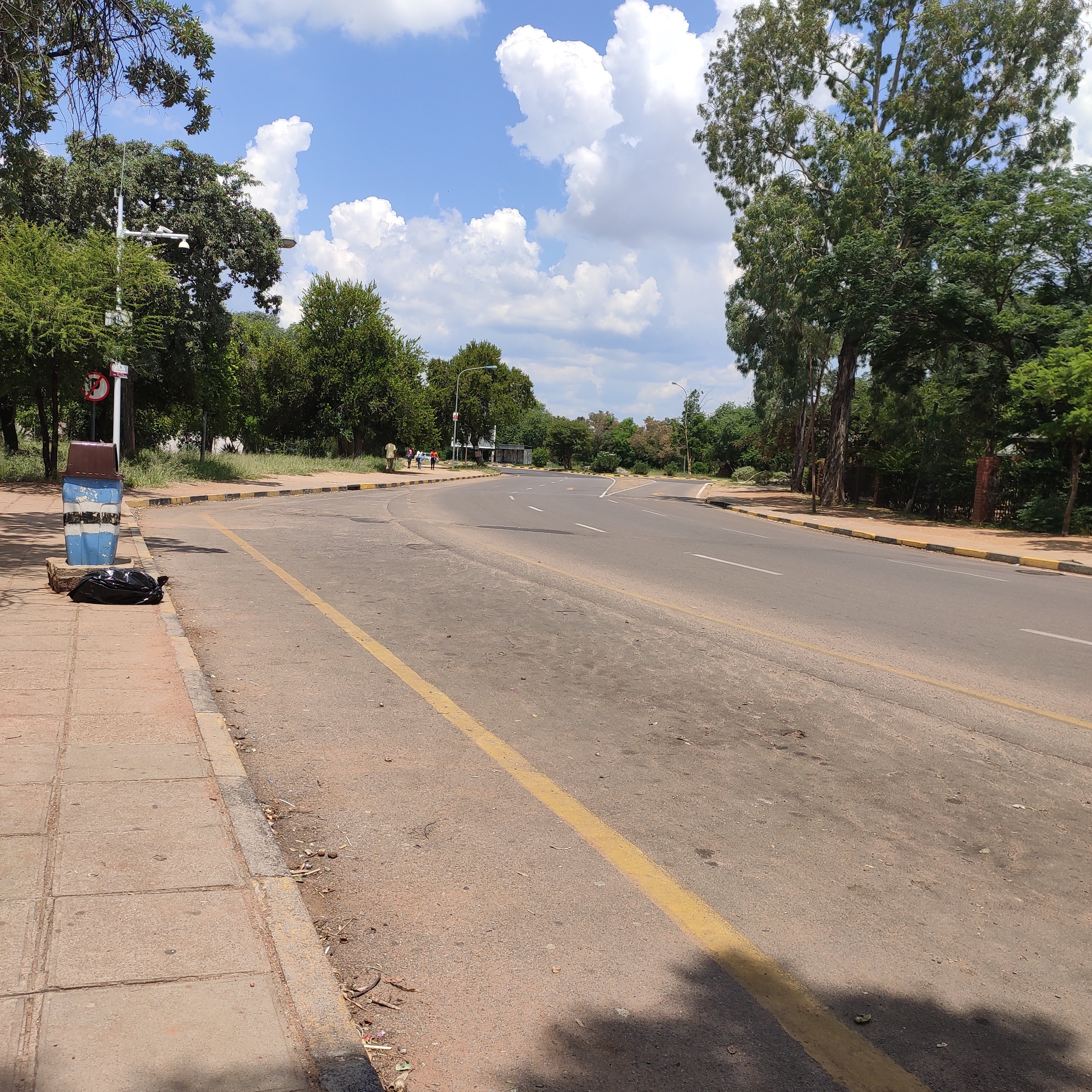
A road in Gaborone

Transportation in Botswana is provided by an extensive network of railways, highways, ferry services and air routes that criss-cross the country. The transport sector in Botswana played an important role in economic growth following its independence in 1966. The country discovered natural resources which allowed it to finance the development of infrastructure, and policy ensured that the transport sector grew at an affordable pace commensurate with demands for services.

=== Financial sector ===
Botswana has a growing financial sector, and the country's national stock market, the Botswana Stock Exchange (BSE), based in Gaborone, is given the responsibility to operate and regulate the equities and fixed interest securities market. Formally established in 1989, the BSE continues to be pivotal to Botswana's financial system, and in particular the capital market, as an avenue on which government, quasi-government and the private sector can raise debt and equity capital. Although the BSE has just under 40 companies listed, it plays host to the most pre-eminent companies doing business in Botswana. These companies represent a spectrum of industries and commerce, from Banking and financial services to Wholesaling and Retailing, Tourism and Information Technology.

Botswana's currency, the pula, is fully convertible and is valued against a basket of currencies heavily weighted toward the South African Rand. Profits and direct investment can be repatriated without restriction from Botswana. The Botswana Government eliminated all exchange controls in 1999. The Central Bank devalued the Pula by 7.5% in February 2004 in a bid to maintain export competitiveness against the real appreciation of the Pula. There was a further 12% devaluation 1 year later in 2005 and the policy of a "Crawling peg" was adopted.

The recently established Non-Bank Financial Institutions Regulatory Authority (NBFIRA) is responsible for the oversight of all non-banking financial services entities in the country. As of 2020, about 82% of Botswana's population had access to formal or informal financial services. Mobile banking services have just started to be offered. In recent years the government and Central Bank have undertaken serious steps to modernize the country's payment system infrastructure. These efforts included the establishment of a code-line clearing system for the exchange of cheques and electronic funds as well as a Real Time Gross Settlement (RTGS) system, including SWIFT connection.

Gaborone is host to the headquarters of the 14-nation Southern African Development Community (SADC). A successor to the Southern African Development Coordination Conference (SADCC), which focused its efforts on freeing regional economic development from dependence on apartheid in South Africa, SADC embraced the newly democratic South Africa as a member in 1994 and has a broad mandate to encourage growth, development, and economic integration in Southern Africa. SADC's Trade Protocol, which was launched on 1 September 2000, calls for the elimination of all tariff and non-tariff barriers to trade by 2012 among the 11 signatory countries. If successful, it will give Botswana companies free access to the far larger regional market. The Regional Centre for Southern Africa (RCSA), which implements the U.S. Agency for International Development's (USAID) Initiative for Southern Africa (ISA), is headquartered in Gaborone as well.

== Trade ==
Botswana is crossed by the trans-African automobile route - the Cairo-Cape Town Highway and the Trans-Kalahari Corridor. Botswana is part of the Southern African Customs Union (SACU) with South Africa, Lesotho, Eswatini, and Namibia. The World Bank reports that in 2001 (the most recent year for which World Bank data is available), the SACU had a weighted average common external tariff rate of 3.6%. According to the U.S. Department of Commerce, "there are very few tariff or non-tariff barriers to trade with Botswana, apart from restrictions on licensing for some business operations, which are reserved for [Botswana] companies." Based on the revised trade factor methodology, Botswana's trade policy score is unchanged.

The main export of Botswana is diamonds. As of 2024 it is the world's second largest diamond exporter. Due to Botswana's heavy reliance on diamonds, strong global demand is vital to the health of the economy. Diamond exports provide Botswana's economy with strong supplies of foreign exchange and have offered a basis for industrial development and stimulated improvements in Botswana's infrastructure. However, despite their preeminent role in Botswana's economy, there are concerns that diamond mines are not labour-intensive enough to provide sufficient employment for Botswana's workforce, and this mismatch has been cited as a factor in the country's structurally high unemployment rate.

== Private sector development and foreign investment ==
I-Towers, Gaborone Central Business District

Botswana seeks to diversify its economy away from minerals, the earnings from which have levelled off.

External investment in Botswana has grown fitfully. In the early 1990s, two American companies, Owens Corning and Heinz, made major investments in production facilities in Botswana. In 1997, the St. Paul Group purchased Botswana Insurance, one of the country's leading short-term insurance providers. An American Business Council (ABC), with over 30 member companies, was inaugurated in 1995. Hyundai operated a car assembly plant in Botswana from 1994 to 2000.

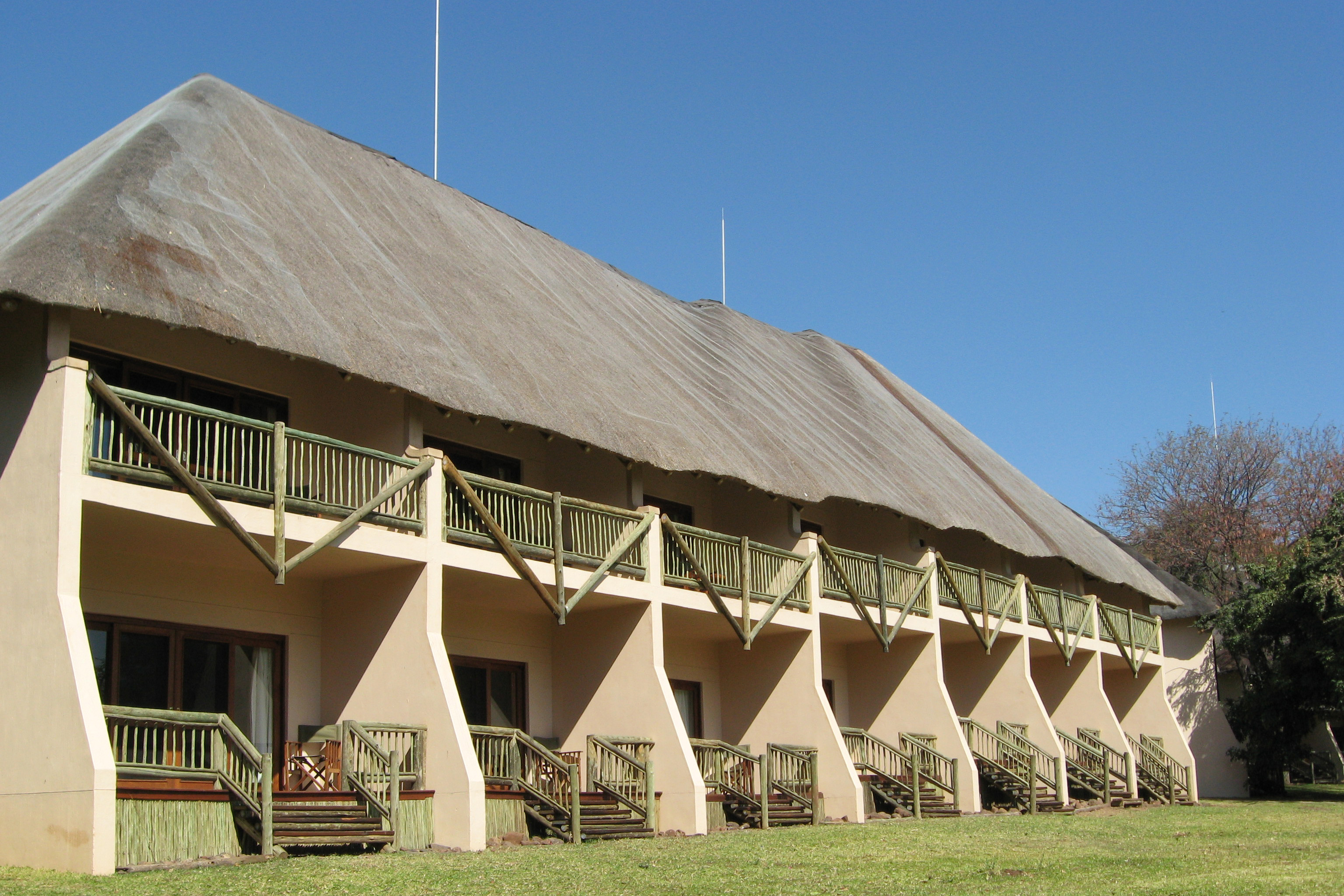
Tourist resort at Kasane

Botswana seeks to further diversify its economy away from minerals, which account for a quarter of GDP, down from nearly half of GDP in the early 1990s. Foreign investment and management are welcomed in Botswana and, as a result, the financial and services sectors have increased at an exponential rate in the 2000s to replace mining as the leading industry. Botswana abolished foreign exchange controls in 1999, has a low corporate tax rate (15%), no prohibitions on foreign ownership of companies, and as of January 2024 it is roughly 4%

The government considers private-sector participation as being critical to the success of the country's Tenth National Development Plan (2009–2016) and enhancing the role of research and development as being the most effective way to nurture entrepreneurship and private-sector growth. The government is considering additional policies to enhance competitiveness, including a new Foreign Direct Investment Strategy, Competition Policy, Privatisation Master Plan and National Export Development Strategy.

Botswana is known to have vast coal deposits making it possibly one of the most coal-rich countries in the world. Large coal mines, massive coal-fired power plants, as well as a coals to liquid plant (through the Fischer–Tropsch process) to produce synthetic automotive fuel have been planned.

With its proven record of good economic governance, Botswana was ranked as Africa's third least corrupt country in the Corruption Perceptions Index in 2020, ahead of many European and Asian countries. The World Economic Forum rated Botswana as the third most economically competitive nation in Africa in 2002. However, Botswana is not a member of the WEF anymore. In 2001 Botswana was once again assigned "A" grade credit ratings by Moody's and Standard & Poor's. This ranks Botswana as by far the best credit risk in Africa and puts it on par with or above many countries in central Europe, East Asia, and Latin America. However, as of 2024, Botswana has been ranked BBB+ in S&P's rating, while being ranked A3 in Moody's grade credit rating.

U.S. investment in Botswana remains at relatively low levels but continues to grow. Major U.S. corporations, such as Coca-Cola and Heinz, are present through direct investments, while others, such as KFC, are present via franchise. The sovereign credit ratings by Moody's and Standard & Poor's clearly indicate that, despite continued challenges such as small market size, landlocked location, and cumbersome bureaucratic processes, Botswana remains one of the best investment opportunities in the developing world.

Due to its history and geography, Botswana has long and deep ties to the economy of South Africa. The Southern Africa Customs Union (SACU), presently comprising Namibia, Botswana, Lesotho, Eswatini, and South Africa, dates from 1910. Under this arrangement, South Africa has collected levies from customs, sales, and excise duties for all five members, sharing out proceeds based on each country's portion of imports. The exact formula for sharing revenues and the decision-making authority over duties—held exclusively by the Government of South Africa—became increasingly controversial, and the members renegotiated the arrangement in 2001. The new structure has now been formally ratified and a SACU Secretariat has been established in Windhoek, Namibia. Following South Africa's accession to the World Trade Organization (WTO), Botswana also joined; many of the SACU duties are thus declining, making products from outside the area more competitive in Botswana. Currently, the SACU countries and the U.S. are negotiating a free trade agreement. Botswana is currently also negotiating a free trade agreement with Mercosur and an Economic Partnership Agreement with the European Union as part of SADC.

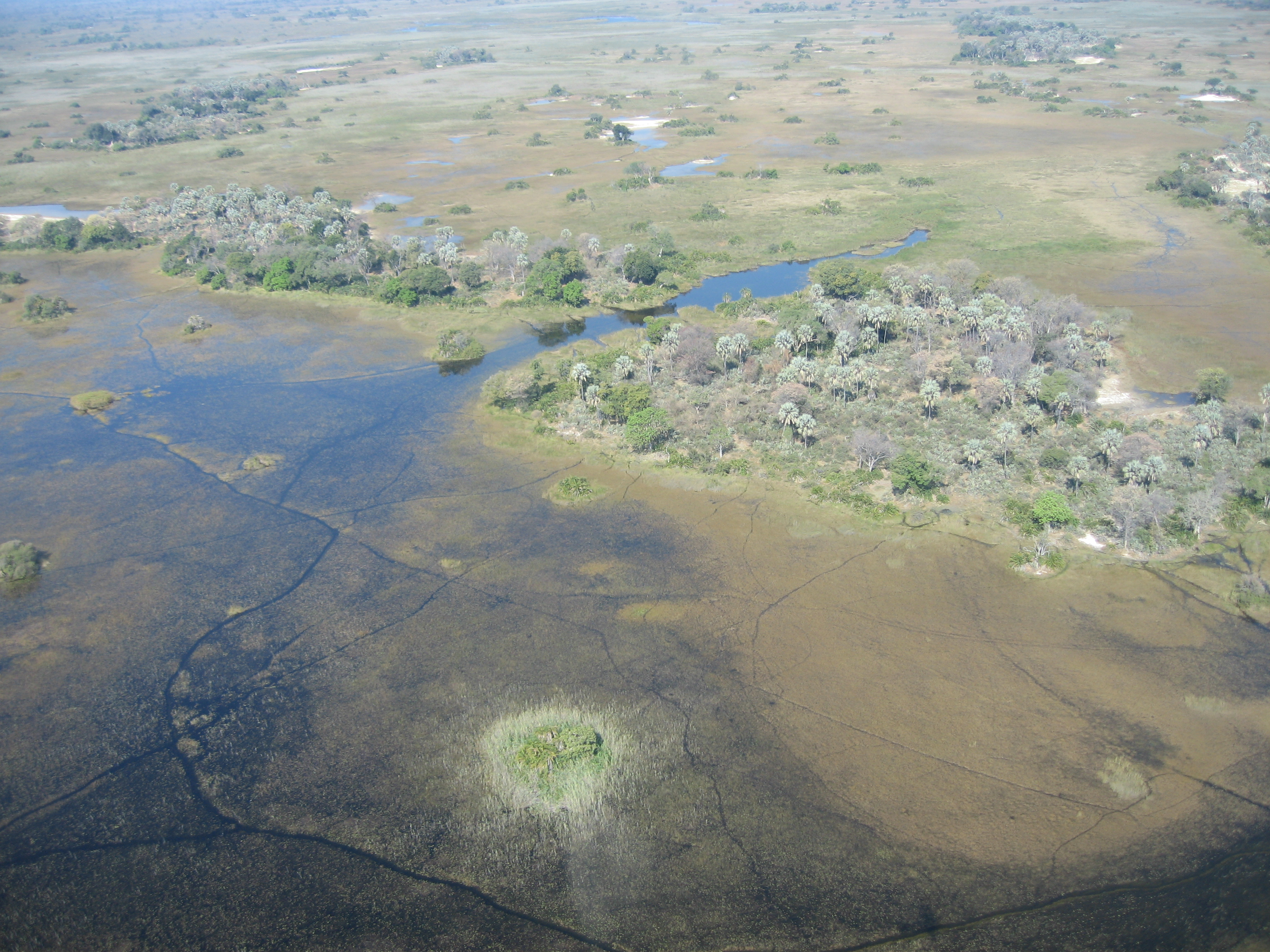
Aerial view over Okavango Delta

Gaborone is host to the headquarters of the fourteen-nation Southern African Development Community (SADC), a successor to the Southern African Development Coordination Conference (SADCC, established in 1980), which focused its efforts on freeing regional economic development from dependence on apartheid South Africa. SADC embraced the newly democratic South Africa as a member in 1994 and has a broad mandate to encourage growth, development, and economic integration in Southern Africa. SADC's Trade Protocol, which was launched on 1 September 2000, calls for the elimination of all tariff and non-tariff barriers to trade by 2012 among the 11 signatory countries. If successful, it will give Botswana companies free access to the far larger regional market.

Botswana has successfully carried an Action Programme on the Elimination of Child Labour, which was adopted in the period 2006–2007. Free the Children delisted Botswana as a nation harbouring child-labour facilities in 2008.

== See also ==
- Botswana
- Education in Botswana
- List of Botswana companies
- Science and technology in Botswana
- United Nations Economic Commission for Africa
