= Manufacturing in Botswana =

Manufacturing in Botswana is a small sector, accounting for roughly 5 percent of the nation’s GDP in 2022. Over the years, there has been a notable decline in the role of the manufacturing sector in the national economy. The reason for this can be pinned to a number of factors, the main ones being lack of skills, failing to keep up with the latest technology, lack of competitiveness along with bad marketing techniques.

The United Nations Development Programme, or UNDP, stated that “[Botswana has a] low manufacturing and production base.” The SADC, including Botswana, aims to double the share of the manufacturing sector value addition in GDP terms to 30 percent by 2030 and 40 percent by 2050, particularly due to overreliance on mining.
