= Doug Munatsi =

Zimbabwean investment banker

Douglas 'Doug' Tawanda Munatsi was a Zimbabwean investment banker. He was the founding CEO of BancABC Holdings, part of Atlas Mara Group and DBF Capital Partners. In 2020, Munatsi was appointed as CEO of Zimbabwe Investment and Development Agency.

Munatsi had a finance and investment background, and held a bachelor's degree in business studies from the University of Zimbabwe as well as a Master of Business Administration (Finance) degree from the American University in Washington D.C. and is an associate of the Bankers Association of Zimbabwe.
