= Jwaneng =

- Town
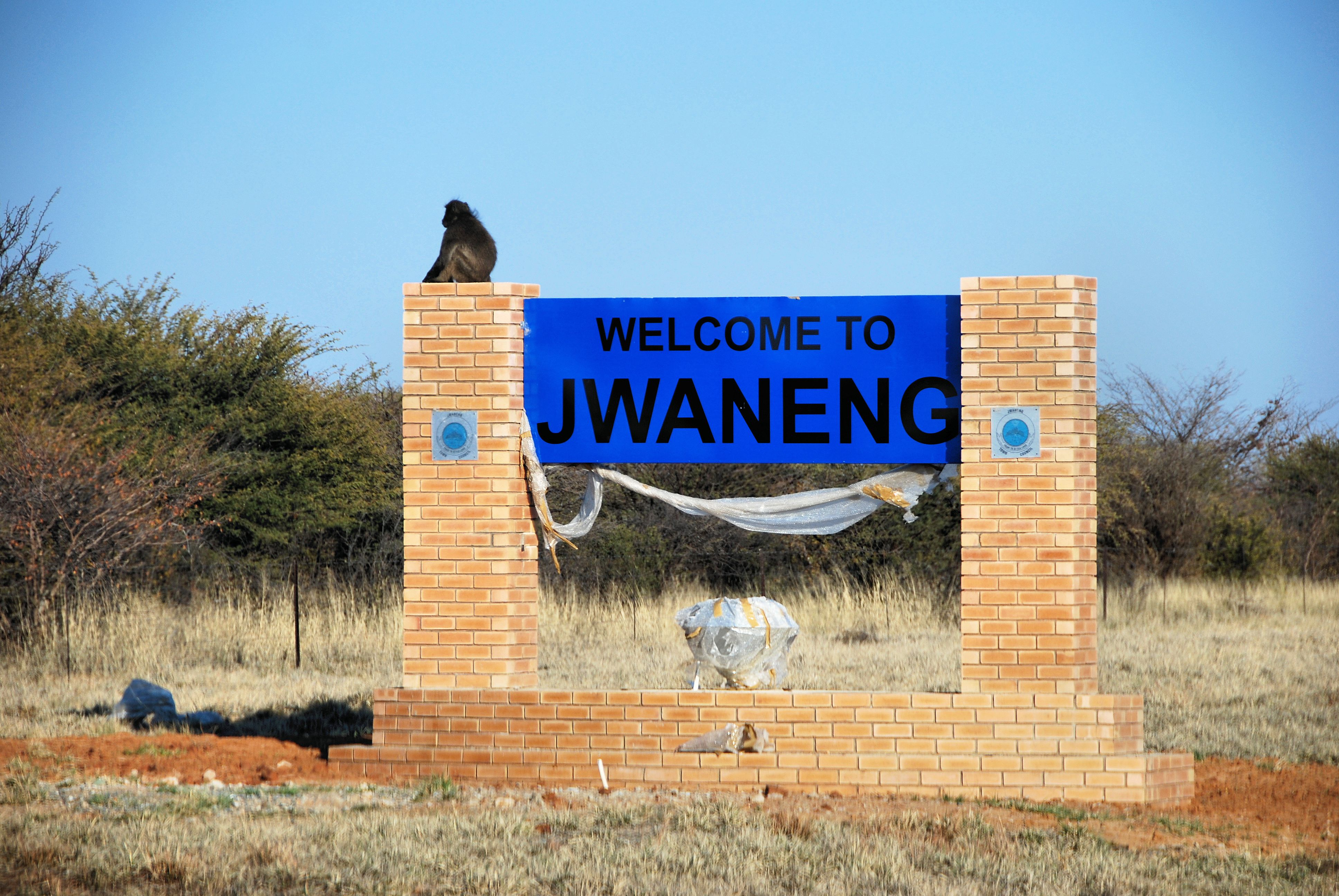

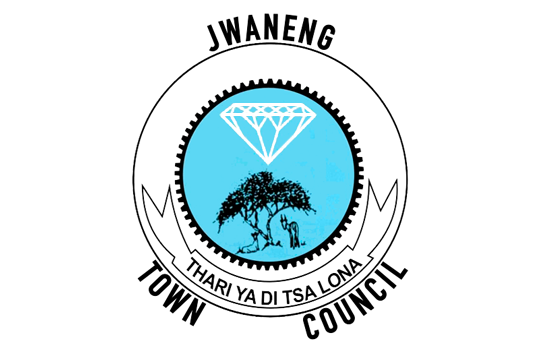
- Flag

- Location within Botswana
- Coordinates: 24°36′07″S 24°43′42″E
- Country: Botswana

Government
  - Mayor: Olga Ditsie
- Elevation: 1,189 m (3,901 ft)

Population (2022)
  - Total: 18,784
- Time zone: GMT +2
- Climate: BSh

Jwaneng is a town located in the Southern District of Botswana, but it is not part of this, being a separate district, with its own Town Council. Of Tswana origin, the name means 'at the pebbles', 'at the small stones', presumably referring to diamonds.

== History ==
The town was formed around the Jwaneng diamond mine, considered the richest in the world in terms of its content of gem-quality diamonds. At its inception it was a 'closed town', meaning that in order to live there permission was needed from the owners of the mine, Debswana.

In 2015, Jwaneng had 13,162 residents. It was identified as the second richest village in Botswana, with a poverty rate of less than 3%.

== Transportation ==
The town and the mine are served by the Jwaneng Airport.

== Sport ==
As of 2026, football club Jwaneng Galaxy F.C. have won the Botswana Premier League three times.

== See also ==
- Jwaneng Solar Power Station
