= Jwaneng Airport =

Airport in Jwaneng, Southern, Botswana

- IATA: JWA; ICAO: FBJW

Summary
- Airport type: Public
- Owner: Debswana
- Location: Jwaneng, Botswana
- Elevation AMSL: 3,900 ft (1,200 m)
- Coordinates: 24°36′05″S 24°41′30″E
- Website: www.dca.gov.bw/...

Map
- Location of airport in Botswana

Runways
| Direction | Length | | Surface |
| Direction | m | ft | Surface |
|---|---|---|---|
| 08/26 | 1,680 | 5,512 | Asphalt |
- Sources: WAD GCM Google Maps

Jwaneng Airport (IATA: JWA, ICAO: FBJW) is an airport serving Jwaneng, a town in the Southern District of Botswana. It is owned by Debswana, which also owns the Jwaneng diamond mine. There is no scheduled airline service.

The Jwaneng non-directional beacon (Ident: JWN) is located on the field.

== See also ==
- Transport in Botswana
- List of airports in Botswana
