= ABCH =

ABCH may refer to:

- Address Book Clearing House, a feature of Microsoft Windows Live Messenger 8.0
- BancABC, a financial services provider in Central and Southern Africa (trading symbol ABCH on the Botswana Stock Exchange and Zimbabwe Stock Exchange)
