= Lynette Armstrong =

Botswana accountant and corporate executive (born 1974)

- Born: 1974 (age 51–52); Botswana
- Occupations: Accountant and corporate executive
- Years active: 1998–present
- Title: Chief financial officer of Debswana

Lynette Armstrong is a Botswana accountant and corporate executive, who was appointed as the acting chief executive officer of Debswana Diamond Company Limited, the largest diamond-mining company in the world, by value. She was appointed to that position in August 2019. Before that, from December 2015 until August 2019, Armstrong was the chief financial officer (CFO) at the same company. She relinquished her CEO/managing director role on 1 June 2022 when Andrew Maatla Motsomi became the new substantive CEO. Armstrong resumed her role of CFO at Debswana.

== Background and education ==
Armstrong was born in Selebi-Phikwe, a copper and nickel mining town in the eastern part of the Central District of Botswana, circa 1974. Her father was a mine worker, at BCL Mine, in the town.

She attended a local primary school then proceeded to Maruapula High School, obtaining her high school diploma (A-Level Certificate) from there, at age 18. She was awarded a scholarship by the mine where her father worked, to go to the United Kingdom and specialise as an accountant. In 1997, she qualified as an Affiliate of the Association of Chartered Certified Accountants.

She has also completed the Accelerated Development Programme at the London Business School, the Management Development Programme at the University of Stellenbosch Business School, the Strategic Marketing Management Programme at the University of Witwatersrand and an Executive Personal Development Coaching Programme, also at Wits.

== Career ==
In 1998, Armstrong returned to Botswana and was given employment at BCL Mine, where her father was employed. She was posted in the cash office, where she “had to learn the basics of accounting”. In 2002, she was appointed chief mine accountant at BCL Mine.

Later that same year, she was hired as a business manager by De Beers Prospecting. She was part of the De Beers pre-feasibility studies team at present-day Karowe Mine. In 2007, she was appointed as the first female finance manager at Orapa, Letlhakane and Damtshaa Mines. In 2010, Lynette resigned from De Beers and took up employment at Tati Nickel Mine. Later, she returned to BCL Mine as the divisional manager for finance and administration, working in that capacity for one year.

In 2013, she responded to an advertisement at Debswana for the financial controller position. Se was hired and over the years, worked up the ladder until she became the chief financial officer of the conglomerate.

In 2019, following the sudden death of her predecessor, Armstrong was appointed as the acting chief executive officer of Debswana Diamond Company Limited.

== Other roles ==
In addition to her responsibilities at Debswana, she serves as the chairperson of the Botswana Accountancy Oversight Authority, and is a member of the board of trustees for Debswana Pension Fund, the board of BoFiNet, and the Board of Morupule Coal Mine. She is also a member of Botswana Institute of Chartered Accountants.

== Personal life ==
Armstrong and her husband are the parents to two children.
