= Marjorie van Heerden =

South African children's book writer and illustrator

Marjorie Hope van Heerden
- Born: October 8, 1949 (age 77); De Doorns, Western Cape, South Africa
- Education: Rustenburg School for Girls Stellenbosch University Michaelis School of Fine Art
- Organization(s): Society of Children's Book Writers and Illustrators (SCBWI)
- Known for: Writing and Illustration of Children's book
- Spouse: Johann van Heerden
- Children: 2

Marjorie Hope van Heerden (born October 8, 1949) is a South African writer and illustrator of children's books. Since the publication of her first children's picture book in 1983, van Heerden has been published as an illustrator or writer/illustrator in 33 languages in Africa, Britain, Europe, Asia, Canada and the USA.

== Biography ==
Born in De Doorns to Alex and Marina van Niekerk (née Botha), Marjorie grew up on a table grapes farm outside De Doorns in the Hex River Valley near Cape Town in South Africa. She matriculated from Rustenburg School for Girls in Cape Town in 1967, studied Fine Art for one year at Stellenbosch University, and then went to the Michaelis School of Fine Art at the University of Cape Town for three years.

In 1973, she married Johann van Heerden and they had two children. In 2003, van Heerden started the South African chapter of the international Society of Children's Book Writers and Illustrators (SCBWI), based in Los Angeles. In 2000, she and a friend also started the SCBWI chapter in Greece. She is currently the co-regional advisor of the South African chapter.

== Awards and honors ==
Marjorie van Heerden won the 2011 W.B. Mkhize Award, given annually by the Usiba Writers' Guild, for the Zulu version of Lulama's long way home (Uhambo LukaLulama Olude), a picture book she wrote and illustrated, published by Giraffe Books, an imprint of Pan MacMillan.

In 2012, van Heerden and author Alex D'Angelo won the M.E.R. Award (one of the Media24 Books Literary Awards) for the best-illustrated children's book published in South Africa. In 2011, they won the award for Goblin Diaries: Apprenticed to the Red Witch, published by Tafelberg Publishers (SA).

This was the second time she has been awarded this award - the first time was in 2008 when she won it with author Wendy Hartmann for Nina and Little Duck, published in 2007 by Human & Rousseau (SA).

== Children's books ==
=== As writer and illustrator ===
- Lulama's Long Way Home, 2007 (also published in Portuguese and all 11 South African official languages);
- The Authentic, Unusual, Alarming, Actual, Factual, Story Book (published in Afrikaans as Die Oorspronklike, Ongewoon Skrikaanjaende, Werklik Feitlike Storieboek), 2006;
- The Adventures of Phepa and Itumelang, 2006;
- Monde's Present reworked second edition, 2005 (published in all 11 South African official languages);
- Monde's Present (based on the original story by Alexia van Heerden), 1997;
- Lana's long way home (published in Afrikaans as Lana se ompad huistoe), 1993;
- A new bed for Alexia (published in Afrikaans as 'n Nuwe bed vir Alexia), 1992;
- Goodnight, Grandpa (published in Afrikaans as Nag Oupa), 1990;
- Looking for a friend (published in Afrikaans as 'n Maat vir Mayedwa), 1988;
- A Monster in the garden, (a Peanutbutter story, published in Afrikaans as 'n Monster in die tuin - 'n Korrelkonfyt-storie), 1987;
- Old enough, (a Peanutbutter story, published in Afrikaans as Oud genoeg - 'n Korrelkonfyt-storie), 1987;
- Father Christmas needs help (a Peanutbutter story, published in Afrikaans as Kersvader het hulp nodig - 'n Korrelkonfyt-storie, 1987;
- A tiger took me to the circus (published in Afrikaans as Sirkus toe saam met 'n tier), 1986;
- Die een groot bruin beer (Afrikaans), 1984.

=== As illustrator ===
- Jim Henry, The Adventures of Willy Nilly and Thumper: Book Four– Charlie, the Cross-Eyed Crocodile, 2017.
- Jim Henry, The Adventures of Willy Nilly and Thumper: Book Three – Stella Star, 2016.
- Jim Henry, The Adventures of Willy Nilly and Thumper: Book Two – The Hermit's Last Hairs, 2016 (also published in Spanish).
- Jim Henry, The Adventures of Willy Nilly and Thumper: Book One - The Lost Treasure of Mount Methuselah, 2016 (also published in Spanish).
- Leon Rousseau, StorieMuis: Boek 3-6 (in Afrikaans, together with illustrators Johann Strauss and Karen Ahlschläger), 2016.
- Leon Rousseau, StorieMuis Omnibus (Book 2), 2015.
- Leon Rousseau, StorieMuis Omnibus (Book 1), 2015.
- Dianne Steward, Folktales from Africa (second edition), 2015.
- Kiara Soobrayan, Blossoms of Scarlet, 2013.
- Sunita Lad Bhamray, Grandma Lim's Persimmons, 2013.
- Leon Rousseau (collected by), four fairy tales in digital format on the Storierak online application store of NB Publishers (Afrikaans), (2013, published in 2012).
- Leon Rousseau (fairy tales collected by), Storieman Omnibus 1 and Storieman Omnibus 2, 2012.
- Kathleen Ahrens and Chu-Ren Huang, Ears Hear(English and Chinese), 2012.
- Kathleen Ahrens and Chu-Ren Huang, Numbers Do (English and Chinese), 2012.
- Ingrid Vander Veken (Dutch original translated into Afrikaans by Antjie Krog), Sam: 'n Ware verhaal van 'n dogtertjie en haar olifant, 2012.
- Alex D'Angelo, Goblin Diaries: Apprenticed to the Red Witch, 2011.
- Desmond Tutu, Children of God - Storybook Bible (one of 20 illustrators, commissioned from around the world), 2010.
- Lewis Carroll, Alice's Adventures in Wonderland (the Afrikaans translation by André P. Brink, Die Avonture van Alice in Wonderland), 2010.
- C.J. Langenhoven, Kootjie Totjie, 2009.
- Jaco Jacobs, Bertus soek 'n Boek (Afrikaans), 2009.
- Ndedi Okorafo-Mbachu, Lonng Juju Man, 2009.
- Wendy Hartmann, Nina and Little Duck (Afrikaans translation: Nina en Eendjie, 2007.
- Raffaelle Delle Donne, San Tales from Africa, 2007.
- Dianne Steward, Folktales from Africa, 2007.
- Gill Munton, A Yeti in Town, A Chinese folk tale (Explorers 3), 2007.
- Mary Clanahan, Die Avonture van Phepa en Itumelang (Afrikaans translation of The Adventures of Phepa and Itumelang), 2006.
- Nick Paul, Uncle James and the Delicious Monster (In Afrikaans: Oom Japie en die Monsterplant), 2005.
- Leon de Villiers, Ek en My Monster (Afrikaans), 2004.
- Arnold Rust, The Haunted Valley, 2004.
- Wynand Louw, Mr Humperdinck's Wonderful Whatsit, 2004. (In Afrikaans, Mnr Humperdinck se wonderlike Watsenaam, 2009)
- Louise Smit, Professor Fossilus en die Dinosourusse (Afrikaans), 2004.
- Katherine Paterson, The King's Equal (Greek translation from English), 2001.
- Vangelis Eliopoulos, The Three Teapots (in Greek), 2000.
- Voula Mastori, In the Wizard's Hands (in Greek), 2000.
- Ann Taylor, Baby Dance, 1999.
- Thomas A. Nevin, The Zebra and the Baboon (translated into various African languages), 1996.
- Thomas A. Nevin, The Mantis, the Girl and the Flowers of Namakwaland (translated into various African languages), 1995.
- Dorian Haarhoff, The Guano Girl, 1995.
- Michelle Holloway, Chloe's Granny (Afrikaans translation:Naomi se Ouma), 1995.
- Brenda Kali, The Story of Buddha, 1994.
- Lesley Beake, Harry went to Paris, 1989.
- Rena Schüler, Natie se Jubeljaar (Afrikaans), 1984.
- Jenny Seed, Katie in die Goudvallei (Afrikaans), 1983.
- Cecilia Saayman, Soetlemoen en Nartjie (Afrikaans), 1983.

== Educational children's books ==
=== As writer and illustrator ===
- Cave, 1998.
- The authentic, true-to-life, unusual, alarming, actual, factual book (Bright Books Reader & Activity Book), 1998.
- The Summer Book (Bright Books, Grade Two series), 1998.
- The Autumn Book (Bright Books, Grade Two series), 1998.
- The Winter Book (Bright Books, Grade Two series), 1998.
- The Winter Book (Bright Books, Grade Two series), 1998.
- The Spring Book (Bright Books, Grade Two series), 1998.
- Frog, 1998.
- Baobab, 1998.
- The Cat Book (Bright Books, Grade One series), 1997.
- The Snake Book (Bright Books, Grade One series), 1997.
- The Goat Book (Bright Books, Grade One series), 1997.
- The Monkey Book (Bright Books, Grade One series), 1997.
- The Zebra Book (Bright Books, Grade One series), 1997.
- The Dog Book (Bright Books, Grade One series), 1997.
- The Mouse Book (Bright Books, Grade One series), 1997.
- The Owl Book (Bright Books, Grade One series), 1997.
- The Rabbit Book (Bright Books, Grade One series), 1997.
- The Donkey Book (Bright Books, Grade One series), 1997.
- The Chicken Book (Bright Books, Grade One series), 1997.
- 21 low-cost picture books for the Ntataise Trust, SA, 1994.

=== As illustrator ===
- Mark Patrick, Today my doctor told me, 2009.
- Nicole Levin, The Jungle Box, 2008.
- Blessing Musariri, Secret of Rukodzi Mountain, 2008.
- Margaret Mckenzie, Saving the Planet – 10 things you should know, 2008.
- Nola Turkington, Alone with Jackals, 2007.
- Maggie Bizzell, What Was That?, 2005.
- Di Steward, The Monkeys in the Trees, 2005.
- David Donald, Camp in the Wild, 2004.
- Abby Wood, The Gardener's Secret, 2004.
- Wendy Flanagan, I am HIV Positive, 2004.
- Beata Kasale, Treasure in the Garden, 2001.
- Kathy Luckett, Sylve Sandalls & Nombulelo Sikhosana, Does your father snore?, 1999.
- Afari Assan, Adefe and the Old Chief, 1999.
- Sally Ward, Dorothy's Visit, 1998.
- Chris Wildman & Fatima Dike, Look what I can do, 1998.
- Sue Guthrie, Mkulu and the Spider, 1996.
- Ray Leitch, Nomathemba's Fire, 1996.
- Various authors, Thuli's Mattress, 1996.
- Sarah Murray & Rod Ellis, The old Man and his Hat, 1995.
- Philip de Vos, Sproete en Snoete (Afrikaans), 1994.
- Philip de Vos, Giere en Grille (Afrikaans), 1994.
- Philip de Vos, Warrelwind se Kind (Afrikaans), 1994.
- Marjorie van Heerden et al., Baba's Plan, 1990.
