= Andrew Maatla Motsomi =

Motswana corporate executive

- Born: Botswana
- Education: University of Botswana; African Institute for Economic Development and Planning; Victoria University of Manchester
- Occupations: Economist and corporate executive
- Years active: 1984–present
- Title: Chief executive officer of Debswana

Andrew Maatla Motsomi is a Motswana economist and corporate executive, who serves as the managing director and chief executive officer of Debswana Diamond Company Limited, the largest diamond-mining company in the world, by value. He was appointed to that position in May 2022 on a five-year contract. He assumed office on 1 June 2022.

== Background and education ==
Motsomi is a Motswana by birth. He holds a bachelor's degree in Economics and Accounting from the University of Botswana. He earned a Postgraduate Diploma in Economic Development and Planning from the African Institute for Economic Development and Planning in Dakar, Senegal. His Master of Arts in economics was obtained from the Victoria University of Manchester.

== Career ==
In 2016, then president of Botswana, Ian Khama, appointed Motsomi as deputy governor of the Bank of Botswana, effective 1 February 2016. While at the bank, he represented Botswana regionally as the chairman of the Botswana Institute for Development Policy Analysis. He also worked on attachment at the International Monetary Fund on behalf of Botswana. His tenure at Bank of Botswana exceeded 35 years of service.

Motsomi took over the helm of Debswana from Lynette Armstrong, the substantive chief financial officer (CFO) at the company, who served as the CEO of the company in acting capacity between August 2019 and May 2022.
