= Louis Goodwill Nchindo =

Personal details
- Born: 30 November 1941 Botswana
- Died: 2010 (aged 68–69) Pandamatenga
- Profession: businessman and political advisor.

Louis Goodwill Nchindo (1941–2010) was a Botswana businessman and political advisor, who rose to political prominence as managing director of Debswana, the Botswana diamond authority. He was found dead in a rural area on the morning of 8 February 2010, having died under unknown circumstances.

== Early life ==
Nchindo was born 30 November 1941 in Tlokweng, Botswana, and was educated in Molepolole and St. Joseph's College, Kgale, Botswana. He went on to study medicine at University College London Medical School, but in 1964 quit the program to enroll at Balliol College, Oxford, receiving BA degree in Politics, Philosophy and Economics. As president of the university's Overseas Student Union, he became friends with a number of future Botswana notables, including later Minister of Mineral Resources and Water Affairs David Magang and future President of Botswana Festus Mogae.

== Business leader ==
After working for Procter and Gamble in Caracas, Venezuela, and southern Africa, Nchindo rose to become the managing director of Debswana, the chairman of the Botswana Stock Exchange, Botswana head for Barclays Bank and resident director of Anglo American in Botswana. Nchindo became director of the Anglo-American owned De Beers Botswana Mining Company, which had government contracts to market all Botswana diamonds. When De Beers Botswana joining with the Botswana government to form Debswana in 1991, Nchindo became its first managing director. He also became an adviser to the President of Botswana and an influential member of the ruling Botswana Democratic Party.

== Scandal and death ==
Nchindo presided over a successful period at Debswana, but eventually fell out with the president, who in 2004 refused to renew his employment. Following his September 2004 retirement, Nchindo was awarded Botswana's highest honor, the Presidential Order of Honour Award, by Former President of the Botswana Festus Mogae during the country's Independence Day celebrations, although he did not attend to ceremony. Prior to this, Nchindo had also gained press attention when he fired 461 Debswana workers for engaging in industrial action.

In 2008 Gaborone Chief Magistrate Lot Moroka brought corruption charges against Nchindo, which were ongoing at the time of his death. During this trial, he revealed that he had arranged secret loans from DeBeers to former President Quett Keitumile Masire, causing a political scandal. He was slated to appear before the court on 6 April 2010 to answer 36 charges of corruption dating from his period as head of Debswana.

Nchindo was last seen at a local Bottle store on the evening of 7 February in Pandamatenga. On 8 February his vehicle was found, locked, in a rural area. Thereafter his partially decomposed torso was found nearby, as well as his identification and a firearm.
