= Trade unions in Botswana =

- National organization(s): BFTU
- Regulatory authority: Ministry of Labour
- Primary legislation: Trade Disputes Act

Global Rights Index
- 4 Systematic violations of rights

International Labour Organization
- Botswana is a member of the ILO

Convention ratification
- Freedom of Association: 22 December 1997
- Right to Organise: 22 December 1997

Trade Unions in Botswana operate within a longstanding democratic system in which the government of Botswana has ratified the International Labour Organization's core conventions, including Conventions 87 (Freedom of Association) and 98 (Right to Organize).

With the exception of members of the Botswana Defence Force, Botswana Police Service, Local Police, and Prison Service, all workers have the right to join unions. However, in practice trade unions complain of difficulties in operating unfettered. The 2004 Trade Disputes Act is seen by unions as "employer-favoured" and requires submitting grievances to a complex procedure which, it is claimed, invariably results in strike action being declared illegal.

== History ==
Formed in 1948, the Francistown African Employees' Union (FAEU), led by G. M. K. Mmusi was the first trade union in Botswana. It existed until 1970, although only being recognised by the Bechuanaland Protectorate in 1964. The Bechuanaland Protectorate Union, led by Lenyeletse Seretse, was formed in 1959, and in 1962 the Bechuanaland Trade Union Congress (BTUC) was established, with Klaas K. Motshidisi as general secretary. The BTUC, which was allied with the Bechuanaland People's Party, foundered three years later, in 1965; and after independence in 1966, with the help of the International Confederation of Free Trade Unions (now ITUC), trade unions in Botswana formed the Bechuanaland Federation of Labour (BFL). However, the BFL had disappeared by 1969.

In the 1970s the Botswana Trade Union and Education Centre were created, and it was replaced in 1977 by the current national trade union centre, the Botswana Federation of Trade Unions (BFTU).

== Present day ==
The BFTU is still the sole national trade union centre in Botswana. Most unions are organized at the enterprise level, with few resources available for cross-enterprise structures such as industrial or craft unionism.

The government of Botswana appears to take a pragmatic approach to trade unions, arguing that they should be formed in order to encourage fair labour practices, facilitate the education of workers, and reduce conflicts between individual employees and employers.
