= Beata Kasale =

Botswana journalist (1961–2018)

Beata Botlhoko Kasale (24 May 1961 – 18 June 2018) was a Botswana publisher and founding editor of The Voice Newspaper. With over 30 years in Journalism, Kasale co-founded The Voice Newspaper, formerly The Francistowner Extra, in 1993 together with Donald Laurence Moore in Francistown and commonly referred to as "the mother of the media industry in Botswana".

== Life ==
Kasale, popularly known as Aus-B in media circles, was the Strategic Advisor for the WAN-IFRA Women in News (WIN) in its formative years, the Acting Chairperson of the Botswana Media Consultative Council and a member of the Media Advisory Council. She was also a Commonwealth Elections Observer.

She also worked for several organisations as chief strategist, including International Media Women’s Foundation (IMWF), African Comprehensive HIV/AIDS Partnership (ACHAP), Commonwealth Secretariat, Commonwealth Press Union, Gender Links, Panos, Open Society Initiative (OSI), OSISA and AMARC.

As a Human Rights defender, Kasale entreated the Government of Botswana to assimilate the marginalised Basarwa (San people) into the larger Botswana society in order that they fully benefit from their country’s resources. Thus in 2010, the 4th President of the Republic of Botswana, Seretse Khama Ian Khama, bestowed upon Kasale the Presidential Certificate of Honour in recognition of her contribution to the development of Botswana through media and human rights advocacy.

In 2001, she published a Children’s book, The Treasure in the Garden with Heinemann, UK.

== Death ==
Kasale died in the early hours of 18 June 2018 after suffering for a long time with sugar diabetes at Bokamoso Private Hospital at the age of 57.

A year after she died in 2019, the Y-Care Charitable Trust – a charity she had devotedly supported - honoured her by setting in motion the annual Marokolwane 20 km Charity Walk, whose beneficiaries include, among others, Rasesa Primary School Library and Autism Botswana.
