= Damtshaa diamond mine =

Diamond mine in Botswana

- Location in Botswana
- Location: Central District, Botswana; 21°18′36″S 25°32′10″E
- Products: Diamonds (292,000 carats in 2003)
- Opened: 25 October 2003
- Company: Debswana
- Website: www.debswana.com

The Damtshaa diamond mine is a diamond mine located in the Central District of Botswana. It is approximately 20 kilometres (12 mi) east of the Orapa kimberlite pipe and about 220 kilometres (140 mi) west of the city of Francistown, and it contains 4 small diamond pipes. The mine is owned by Debswana, a partnership between the De Beers company Debswana and the government of Botswana. It opened on 25 October 2003.

Damtshaa is of open pit construction, located on top of four distinct kimberlite pipes of varying ore grade. The mine is forecast to produce about 5 million carats (1,000 kg) of diamond from 39 million tons of ore over the projected 31 year life of the mine. In 2003, the Damtshaa mine produced 292,000 carats (58.4 kg). Recovered ore grade averages about 0.6 carats (12 mg) per metric ton. The ore produced at Damtshaa is processed at a processing plant at its sister mine, the Orapa diamond mine, about 20 km (12 mi) distant. The Damtshaa mine is also managed from the Orapa mine, and is included in Orapa's and Letlhakane's safety and environmental programs, meaning that Damtshaa is also ISO 14001 certified. Damtshaa employs around 180 people.

== History ==
=== Geology ===
The BK9 kimberlite forms part of the Damtshaa diamond mine operation by the Orapa kimberlite cluster in central Botswana. It was intruded approximately 90 million years ago through an achaean granite-gneiss basement and Karoo Supergroup sedimentary formations, the present level of exposure is situated within tholeiitic basalts of the Stormberg Group.

=== 2000–present ===
The Damtshaa mine's construction commenced in 2001. The mine opened on 25 October 2003 by Former President Ian Khama. The mine closed in 2020 because it produced low-quality diamonds that cost too much to mine.

== Geology ==
While most diamonds in the other Debswana-owned Orapa, Jwaneng, and Letlhakane mines formed from a specific crust-derived rock type called eclogite, diamonds from the Damtshaa mine formed from mantle rock called peridotite.

The mine consists of three coalesced North, Central, and South pipes filled predominantly with dark volcaniclastic kimberlite, exhibiting evidence of gas fluidisation and post-eruption epiclastic crater infilling.
