= The Voice (Botswana) =

The Voice Newspaper
- Speaks for Itself
- Format: Tabloid
- Owner: The Francistowner (Pty) Ltd.
- Founder(s): Beata Kasale; Don Laurence Moore
- Publisher: The Francistowner (Pty) Ltd.
- Editor-in-chief: Emang Bokhutlo
- Founded: 1993
- Language: English and Setswana
- Website: thevoicebw.com

The Voice is a print and online newspaper based in Botswana founded by Beata Kasale and Don Laurence Moore. The Voice was founded in Francistown in 1993 as The Francistowner Extra; in 1999 it opened offices in the national capital, Gaborone. It has adopted a tabloid format which means shorter stories, bigger pictures and bolder headlines. The overall newspaper style encouraged journalist to develop a creative writing identity. Readership is at 30,000 copies per edition containing mostly human interest stories.

== Awards and recognition ==
- 2008, Sol Plaatje Leadership and excellence Award in the region, in recognition of its effort in reporting HIV/AIDS
- PMR Africa Diamond Arrow which recognizes organizations that do their best to help stimulate the Botswana's economic growth and development
- 2015, Print Media of the Year by the Botswana National Sports Council

== See also ==
- Mmegi
- Botswana Guardian
- The Botswana Gazette
- Yarona FM
