= Access Bank Botswana =

Commercial bank in Botswana

- Type: Subsidiary
- Industry: Financial Services
- Founded: 1997; 29 years ago
- Headquarters: Gaborone, Botswana
- Key people: Herbert Wigwe (group CEO)
- Products: Loans, Investments, Mortgages
- Parent: Access Bank Group
- Website: botswana.accessbankplc.com

Access Bank Botswana, is a commercial bank formerly known as BancABC Botswana, that is headquartered in Gaborone, Botswana. In October 2021, Access Bank Group concluded the acquisition of 78.15 percent shareholding in the stock of the erstwhile BancABC Botswana. The bank subsequently rebranded to its current name to reflect its shareholding. The shares of stock of Access Bank Botswana are traded on the Botswana Stock Exchange, under the symbol: ACCESS. The company shareholding amounting to 21.85 percent that is not controlled by Access Bank Group is free-floating on the BSE.

== Overview ==
Access Bank Botswana was the fifth largest financial services provider in Botswana, as of October 2021. The bank is a subsidiary of Access Bank Group, a financial services conglomerate based in Nigeria, with subsidiaries in nine sub-Saharan countries, the United Kingdom and the United Arab Emirates. The group also maintains representative offices in China, India and Lebanon. The group's shares of stock are listed on the Nigerian Stock Exchange under the symbol ACCESS. As of 31 December 2021, Access Bank Group had total assets in excess of US$28 billion.

== History ==
The establishment of ABC Holdings Limited commenced with a merger between First Merchant Bank (FMB) and Heritage Investment Bank (HIB) in 1997.

BancABC logo prior to 2014 acquisition by Atlas Mara and converting to Access Bank

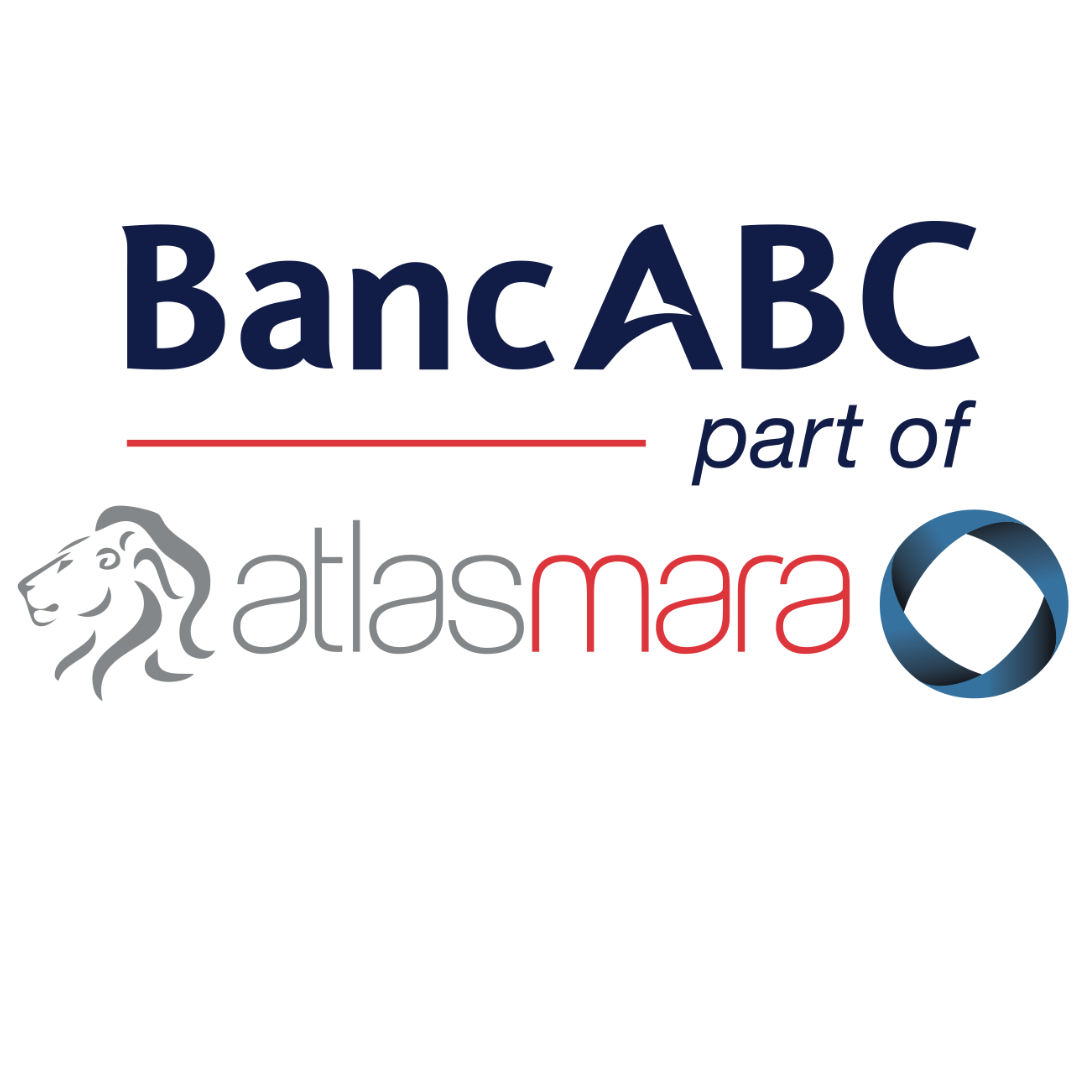
BancABC logo after the 2014 acquisition by Atlas Mara

ABC Holdings Limited was registered and listed on the Botswana Stock Exchange, with a secondary listing on the Zimbabwe Stock Exchange in 2000. The certification committee of the Botswana International Financial Services Centre (IFSC) granted IFSC status to both ABC Holdings Limited and African Banking Corporation (International) Limited, which is a 100 percent subsidiary of ABC Holdings Limited. In April 2009, the bank re-branded to BancABC.

On 31 March 2014, Atlas Mara Co-Nvest Limited announced its offer to acquire ABC Holdings Limited. Atlas Mara made direct agreements with existing shareholders to acquire up to 88 percent of the group and subsequently make a mandatory offer for the remaining 12 percent stake in BancABC. This acquisition deal was valued at approximately US$265 million. The acquisition was concluded on 28 November 2014 and ABC Holdings Limited's stock was delisted from the BSE and ZSE. The bank was acquired by Access Bank Group in 2021.

== Ownership ==
The shares of stock of Access Bank Botswana are listed on the Botswana Stock exchange, where they trade under the symbol ACCESS. The table below illustrates the shareholding in the stock of Access Bank Botswana, as of October 2021.

Shareholding In Access Bank South Africa In October 2021
Rank	Shareholder	Domicile	Percentage	Notes
1	Access Bank Group	Nigeria	78.15	
2	Other Investors on BSE	International	21.85	
	Total		100.0	

== See also ==
- List of banks in Botswana
- List of companies of Botswana
- List of banks in Africa
- List of companies in Gaborone
