= The Botswana Gazette =

English language newspaper published in Gaborone, Botswana

- Kitso ke maatla (English: Knowledge is Power)
- Type: Daily newspaper
- Format: Online newspaper
- Editor: Lawrence Seretse
- Language: English
- Headquarters: Gaborone, Botswana
- Circulation: ~20,000 per week
- OCLC number: 57135198
- Website: thegazette.news

The Botswana Gazette is an English language newspaper published in Gaborone, Botswana.

In 2015, the paper's managing editor (Shike Olsen), its editor (Lawrence Seretse), a reporter (Innocent Selatlhwa) and the paper's lawyer (Joao Salbany) were arrested following a raid of their offices by the Directorate on Corruption and Economic Crime.

== See also ==
- The Voice Botswana
- Botswana Guardian
- Mmegi
- Yarona FM
