= Botswana Guardian =

- Type: Weekly newspaper
- Format: Broadsheet
- Publisher: CBET Ltd
- Founded: 1982
- Headquarters: Gaborone, Botswana
- ISSN: 1811-4369
- OCLC number: 46404159
- Website: guardiansun.co.bw

The Botswana Guardian is an English language weekly newspaper published in Gaborone, Botswana, by CBET (Pty) Ltd; it first appeared in October 1982. The newspaper shares an online edition with its sister title The Midweek Sun at guardiansun.co.bw.

The paper was started in 1982. It is published by CBET Ltd. on Thursdays.

== History ==
Bibliographic records show earlier imprints for the title in Gaborone, including Pula Printing and Publishing (Pty) Ltd and Media Publishing (Pty) Ltd, reflecting changes in the newspaper’s corporate structure over time.

== Ownership and sister publications ==
Botswana Guardian and its sister title, The Midweek Sun, are published by CBET (Pty) Ltd.

== Public reception and impact ==
Coverage by the Botswana Guardian has periodically prompted official responses, underscoring the paper’s national visibility. For example, on 6 February 2023 Botswana’s Office of the President issued a public rebuttal of a Botswana Guardian article.

== Digital audience and advertising inventory ==
The group’s website, guardiansun.co.bw, serves as the online edition of the Botswana Guardian and its sister title The Midweek Sun and offers a full e-edition for readers beyond print. The site’s advertising page lists banner placements sold in 100,000-impression monthly packages (e.g., 970×90 top banner; 300×600 side banner), indicating six-figure monthly digital inventory per placement on the domain.

== Media context ==
Independent monitors describe Botswana’s media environment as generally improving in safety but still facing structural constraints and regulatory challenges. Public-opinion data from Afrobarometer provide additional context on audience views of media freedom and the press’s watchdog role in Botswana.

== See also ==
=== Newspapers ===
- The Voice
- Mmegi
- The Botswana Gazette

=== Broadcasting ===
- Yarona FM
