= Mmegi =

English-language weekly newspaper in Botswana

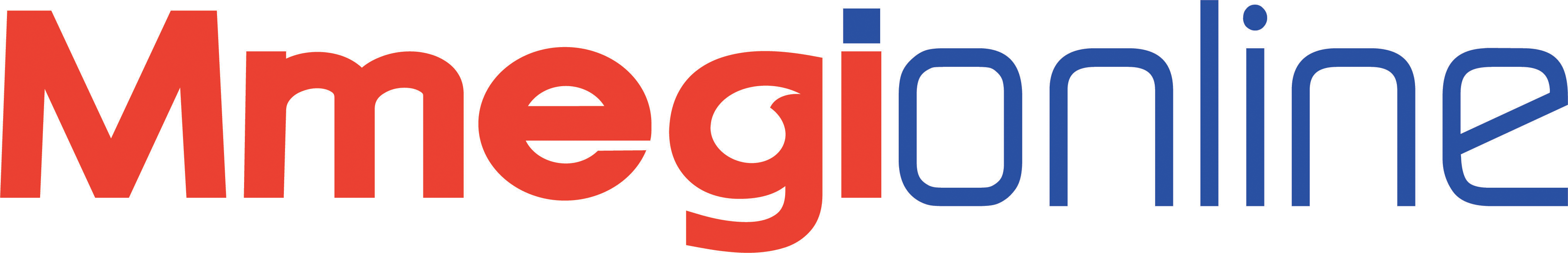
- Type: Weekly Friday newspaper
- Owner: Mmegi Investment Holdings
- Publisher: Dikgang Publishing Company
- Editor: Ryder Gabathusi (Acting)
- Founded: 1984
- Headquarters: Gaborone, Botswana
- Price: P10.00
- Website: mmegi.bw

Mmegi is a newspaper in Botswana. Established in 1984, it publishes in English and Setswana. It is published daily online and weekly in print format by Dikgang Publishing House in the capital, Gaborone. Mmegi used to be Botswana's only independent newspaper to be published daily. The newspaper's name means "the reporter" in Setswana and its strapline is "News we need to know daily". It was formerly known as Mmegi wa Dikgang/The Reporter.

== See also ==
- The Voice Botswana
- Botswana Guardian
- The Botswana Gazette
- Yarona FM
