= Mack Air =

Airline of Botswana

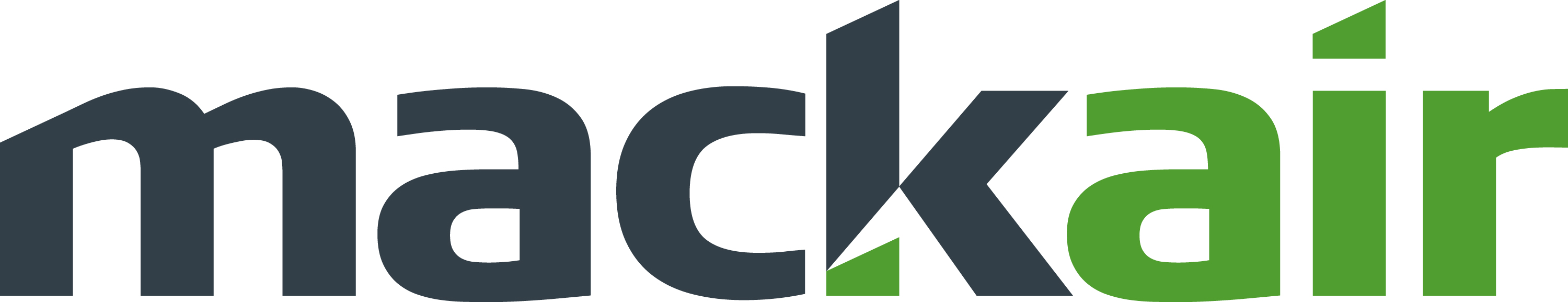
IATA	ICAO	Call sign
-	MKB	Greentail
- Commenced operations: 1994
- Fleet size: See Fleet below
- Headquarters: Maun, Botswana
- Key people: Stuart and Lara Mackay
- Employees: 110 (2021)
- Website: mackair.co.bw

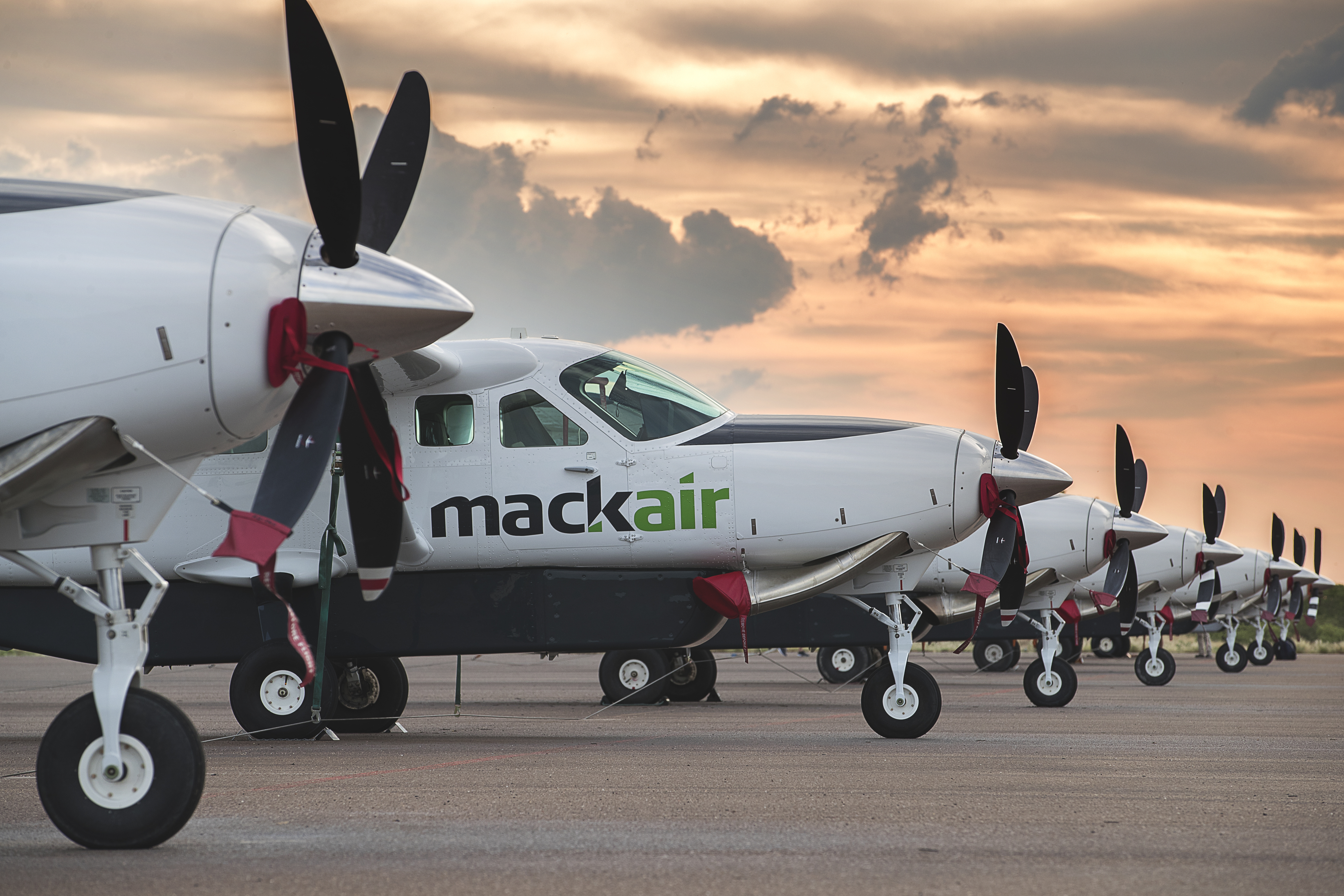
Mack Air Cessna Grand Caravan EX aircraft in Maun, Botswana

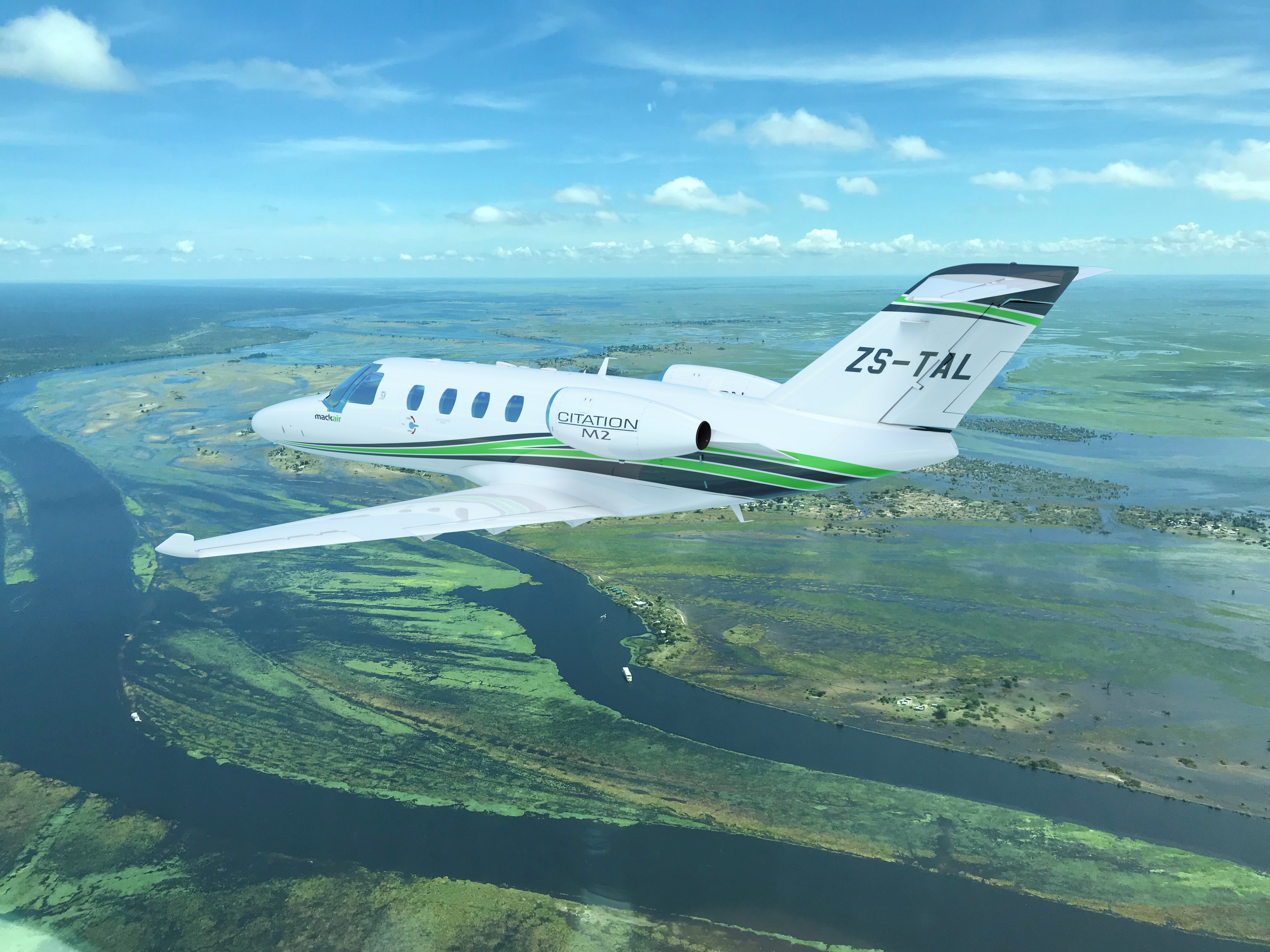
Mack Air Cessna Citation M2 over the Zambezi River in flood season

Former company logo

Mack Air is a charter airline based in Maun, Botswana. The company has been operating in northern Botswana since 1994.

The company provides aircraft for charter, scenic, medical evacuation, and services a wide range of tourist destinations within Botswana and the Southern Africa region; as well as providing supply flights to camps and lodges within the Okavango Delta and Kalahari regions of Botswana.

== History ==
Mack Air was founded at Maun Airport, Botswana in 1994 by Lara and Stuart Mackay with a single Cessna 206 Stationair.

In 2007 Mack Air employed 15 people and in 2019 reported 50 employees, including 19 pilots. By 2021 it had 110 employees, including 30 pilots.

In 2017, the company took delivery of ten new Cessna Grand Caravan EXs as part of its fleet expansion.

In 2019, Mack Air became the first private commercial operator in Botswana to be issued an International Scheduled Air Service Licence.

== Accidents and incidents ==
On 6 January 2010 the company's Cessna 208 crashed and was "extensively damaged" upon takeoff from Piajio Airstrip, Chief's Island, Okavango Delta, Botswana when its engine failed. The aircraft landed on a wet flood plain and overturned. The pilot and the five passengers were all injured, including one passenger who suffered a broken hip. The pilot and four of the injured passengers were evacuated to a South African hospital.

== Destinations ==
The following is a list of destinations Mack Air flies to as part of its scheduled services, as of February 2022:

- Kasane - Kasane Airport
- Victoria Falls - Victoria Falls Airport

== Fleet ==
- Cessna Citation M2
- Cessna 208 Grand Caravan EX
- Cessna 210 Centurion
- GippsAero GA8 Airvan
