= Botswana Meat Commission =

The Botswana Meat Commission (BMC) is a non-profit body which was established by the government of the newly independent Botswana in 1965. Its main functions are the buying, slaughtering, processing, and marketing of all beef and beef products within Botswana for sale in local and international markets.

Company logo

== Facilities and subsidiaries ==
The BMC is headquartered in Lobatse. Its facilities consist of an integrated complex which includes an abattoir, canning, tanning and by-products plants. A throughput of 8000 cattle and 500 small stock are handled on a daily basis. The BMC also operates two branch abattoirs, one in Maun and the other in Francistown, with respective capacities of 100 cattle per day and 400 cattle and 150 small stock per day.

Along with its core business, the BMC owns transport companies in Botswana. On an international scale, it also owns marketing subsidiaries in European countries including the United Kingdom, Germany and the Netherlands, and cold storage facilities in the UK and South Africa. It also owns an insurance company in the Cayman Islands.

== Operations ==
The BMC co-ordinates the production of beef from a national herd grazing on predominantly communal ranch lands which cover a large portion of the country. The population of the cattle suffered a notable decline between the 1980s and the early 2000s, with numbers decreasing from roughly three million to about 1,700,000.

The company is closely monitored by the Botswana Veterinary Services for quality control. All stages of its production are certified to the ISO 9002 quality system. Chilled vacuum-packed beef cuts have a shelf-life of six months provided that the cold chain is maintained at a constant, specified minimum temperature. BMC also produces frozen boneless beef for manufacturing purposes with a two-year shelf-life as well as corned beef and other canned beef products for export. A 2005 report cited the company's European quota of frozen beef as 19,000 tonnes per year.
