= Letlhakane diamond mine =

Diamond mine in Botswana

Letlhakane Diamond Mine
- Location in Botswana
- Location: Botswana; 21°31′13″S 25°41′20″E
- Products: Diamonds (583,000 carats in 2015)
- Opened: 1975
- Company: Debswana
- Website: http://www.debswana.com/Operations/Pages/Letlhakane-Mine.aspx

The Letlhakane diamond mine is a diamond mine located in Botswana about 190 kilometers (120 mi) west of the city of Francistown. Letlhakane, meaning "little reeds", is owned by Debswana, a partnership between the De Beers company and the government of Botswana. It is the second oldest of four mines operated by the company, having begun operations in 1975.

Letlhakane is of open pit construction. In 2003, the mine produced 1.06 million carats (212 kg) of diamond. The recoverable ore grade at the mine was about 0.26 carats (52 mg) per ton. The ore produced at Letlhakane used to be processed at a processing plant at its sister mine, Orapa diamond mine, about 50 km (31 mi) distant. The Letlhakane mine is also managed from the Orapa mine.

In 2015, over 2.1 million tons per year of ore was mined, and over 2.3 million tons was treated, resulting in 583,000 carats (116.6 kg) of diamonds.

== Ceasing of open pit operations ==
As of 2017, the Letlhakane Mine ceased open pit operations and completed a plant for the processing of tailings. This is expected to extend the life of the operations at this facility until 2043.
