= Orapa diamond mine =

Diamond mine in Botswana

- Botswana
- Location: Orapa,, Botswana; 21°18′30″S 25°22′10″E
- Products: Diamonds (16.3 million carats in 2003)
- Opened: July 1971; 55 years ago
- Company: Debswana
- Website: debswana.com

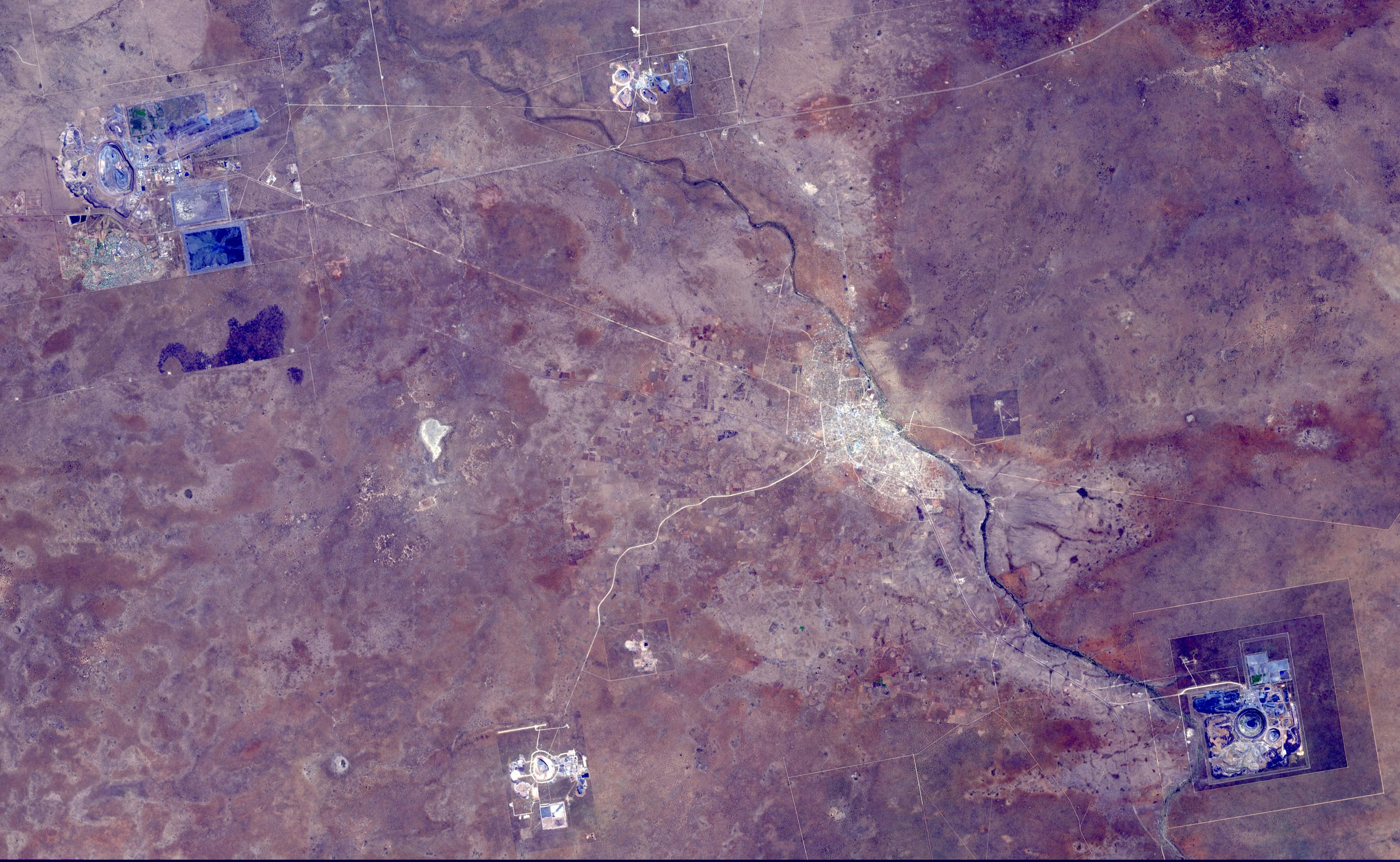

The Orapa diamond mine is the world's largest diamond mine by area. The mine is located in Orapa, a town in the Central District of Botswana about 240 km (150 mi) west of the city of Francistown. Orapa ("resting place for lions") is owned by Debswana, a partnership between the De Beers company and the government of Botswana. The mine was discovered on 1 March 1967, a year after Botswana's independence, by a team of De Beers geologists, including Manfred Marx, Jim Gibson and led by Dr. Gavin Lamont. It is the oldest of four mines operated by the company, and began operations in July 1971 and its first production was 1,438,168 carats (287,633.6 g). The revenue the mine generated is credited for transforming the Botswana economy, as it allowed the government to invest in critical social services and national infrastructure.

Orapa is an open pit style of mine and is the largest diamond mine in the world by area. The mine is located on two kimberlite pipes that converge near the surface, covering 1.18 km^{2} (0.46 sq mi). Orapa operates seven days per week, and produces 20 million tonnes (20,000,000 long tons; 22,000,000 short tons) of ore and an additional 40 million tonnes (39,000,000 long tons; 44,000,000 short tons) of waste rock per year. Currently, the Orapa mine annually produces approximately 10.8 million carats (2,160 kg) of diamonds. The recoverable ore grade at the mine is about 0.87 carats (0.174 g) per tonne. The mine was expanded in 1999, doubling its previous capacity. The processing plant at Orapa processes the ore produced at Orapa and Damtshaa diamond mines.

Orapa and its sister mine Letlhakane employ over 3,100. Debswana also maintains a 100-bed hospital, pre-primary and primary schools for employees' children, and the Orapa game park. The mine maintains an ISO 14001 certificate for environmental compliance, and places some importance on water conservation and waste management.

The preserved Cretaceous (Turonian ~94-90 million years old) lake sediments overlying the pipe are an important locality for fossil insects.

The mine has inspired a board game titled Orapa Mine. In real-world mining operations, geological analysis and scanning techniques are used to locate diamonds and other valuable minerals beneath the surface. The board game, widely popular in Ivory Coast, loosely reflects this concept by having players use abstract “waves” to infer the position of hidden resources. Rather than simulating actual mining processes, it translates subsurface exploration into a logic and deduction puzzle.
