= Jwaneng diamond mine =

Diamond mine in the Kalahari Desert, Botswana

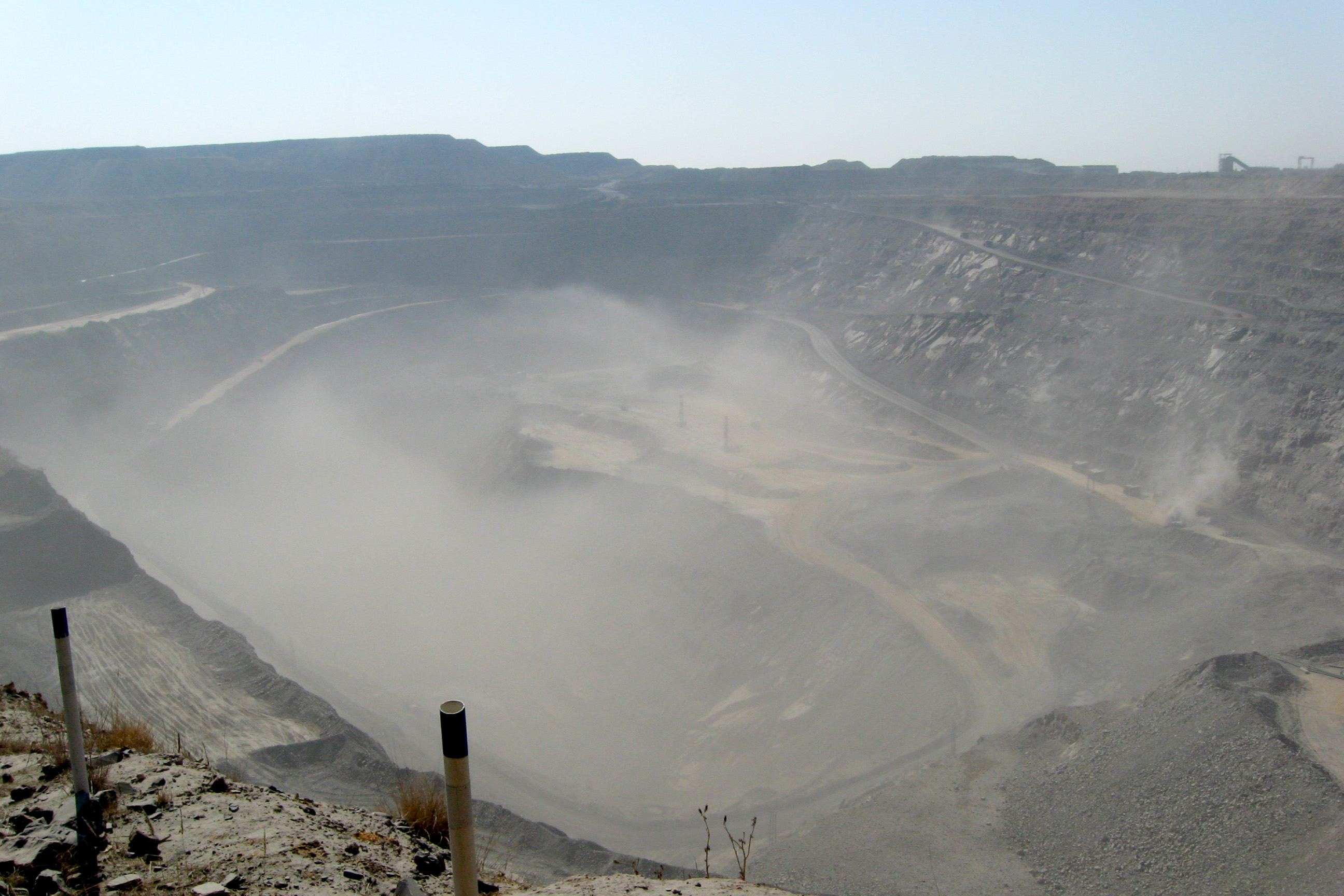
- Jwaneng diamond mine

- Location in Botswana
- Location: Naledi River Valley, Kalahari Desert,, Botswana; 24°31′23″S 24°42′07″E
- Products: Diamonds
- Opened: 1982
- Company: Debswana

The Jwaneng diamond mine is the richest diamond mine in the world, and also the second largest in the world. It is nicknamed "the Prince of Mines", and is located in south-central Botswana about 170 kilometers (110 mi) southwest of the city of Gaborone.

Jwaneng means "a place of gems", and the Jwaneng mine means "where a small stone is found" in Setswana. The mine is owned by Debswana, a joint venture between De Beers and the government of Botswana. It commenced operations in 1982.

The mine owns and operates the local Jwaneng Mine Hospital, Acacia Primary School, and Jwaneng Airport. The mine maintains an ISO 14001 certificate for environmental compliance, being the first mine in Botswana to achieve this certification in 2000.

== History ==
=== Discovery and early exploration ===
In the early 1970s, extensive geological surveys by De Beers Exploration led to the identification of the Jwaneng deposit in February 1973, and after 9 years of evaluation and construction it became fully operational in 1982. In 2021, around 107 million tonnes of rock were mined. In 2023, it produced 13.3 million carats of diamonds.

=== Timeline of discovery ===
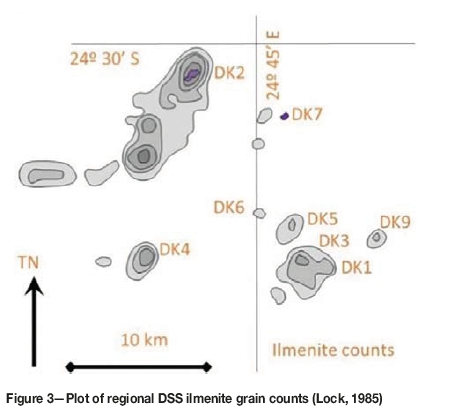
Plot of regional detailed soil sampling ilmenite grain counts in the Jwaneng diamond mine

Year	Activity	Geologist(s)	Discovery	Note	Reference
1962	Road reconnaissance	Jim Gibson and Jim Platt	Barren samples	n/a	
1963	No activity			n/a	
1964	No activity			n/a	
1965	No activity			n/a	
1966	No activity			n/a	
1967	No activity			n/a	
1968	No activity			n/a	
1969	Reconnaissance soil sampling	Mike Whateley, Keith Huxham and others	First kimberlite indicator material recoveries, confirmed by DRL	(Note: DRL stands for Diamond Research Laboratory, De Beers Campus, Crown Mines, Johannesburg)	
1970	Detailed soil sampling	Mike Whateley and Bruce Lynn	Progressive kimberlite indicator material spatial distribution results	n/a	
1971	Detailed grid loaming	Mike Whateley and Bruce Lynn	Progressive kimberlite indicator material spatial distribution results	n/a	
1972	Ground magnetics and gravity/drilling	Peter Bickerstaff	2424D/K1	(Note: 2424KD/KX refers to an ilmenite field.)	
1972	Detailed soil sampling/detailed grid loaming/ground magnetics/drilling	Stuart Vercoe and Norman Lock	2424D/K2	(Note: 2424KD/KX refers to an ilmenite field.)	
1973	Detailed soil sampling/detailed grid loaming/ground magnetics/drilling	Stuart Vercoe and Norman Lock	2424D/K2	(Note: 2424KD/KX refers to an ilmenite field.)	
1974	Detailed grid loaming/ground magnetics/drilling/airborne magnetics	Stuart Vercoe and others	2424KD/K3 and 2424KD/K4	(Note: 2424KD/KX refers to an ilmenite field.)	
1975	Detailed grid loaming/ground magnetics/drilling	Stuart Vercoe and others	2424D/K5 and 2424KD/K6	(Note: 2424KD/KX refers to an ilmenite field.)	
1976	Detailed grid loaming/ground magnetics/drilling	Stuart Vercoe and others	2424D/K7	(Note: 2424KD/KX refers to an ilmenite field.)	
1977	Detailed grid loaming/ground magnetics/drilling	Stuart Vercoe and others	2424D/K8	(Note: 2424KD/KX refers to an ilmenite field.)	

== Geology ==
The Jwaneng Diamond Mine is situated within the Orapa Kimberlite Field. In the mine lies the "Jwaneng pipe," a volcanic crater formed during the Permian period. The mine consists of three kimberlite pipes. Diamond-bearing ores are extracted from the vast pit and transported to processing facilities and manufacturing facilities.

== Economic impact ==
=== Employment ===
The mine employs more than 2,500 people as of 2024. A major project aims to extend production at Jwaneng by creating around 4,500 jobs or more a year, and is expected to contribute more than US$25 billion to Botswana’s economy. This project also plans on increasing the mine's depth from 400 meters to 650 meters.
