= Debswana =

Diamond mining company in Botswana

Debswana Diamond Company Limited
- Type: Limited
- Industry: Mining
- Predecessor: De Beers Botswana Mining Company
- Founded: June 23, 1969; 57 years ago
- Headquarters: Gaborone, Botswana
- Area served: Worldwide
- Key people: Bruce Cleaver (chairman); Andrew Maatla Motsomi (managing director)
- Products: Diamonds; Coal
- Owner: Government of Botswana (50%) and De Beers (50%)
- Number of employees: 6,400 (2020)
- Website: debswana.com

Debswana Diamond Company Limited, or simply Debswana, is a mining company located in Botswana, and is the world's leading producer of diamonds by value. Debswana operates four diamond mines in the eastern and central parts of Botswana, as well as a coal mine. Debswana is a joint venture between the government of Botswana and the South African diamond company De Beers; each party owns 50 percent of the company.

== Mines ==
The mines Debswana owns and operates are:

- Orapa diamond mine, opened in 1971
- Letlhakane diamond mine, opened in 1975
- Jwaneng diamond mine, opened in 1982
- Damtshaa diamond mine, opened in 2003

== History ==
Debswana was formed as the De Beers Botswana Mining Company on 23 June 1968, after De Beers geologists identified diamond-bearing deposits at Orapa in the 1960s. Over the next five years, the government of Botswana increased its ownership stake from an original 15 percent to 50 percent. On March 25, 1992, the name of the company was changed to Debswana Diamond Company (Proprietary) Limited. The company's primary objective is diamond mining and associated processes.

Debswana operates the Orapa, Letlhakane, Jwaneng and Damtshaa Mines. The four mines have contributed significantly to Botswana's socio-economic growth through diamond revenue, transforming the country from an agriculturally based economy in the 1960s to a country that has consistently displayed one of the highest economic growth rates in the world.

Debswana unearthed a 1,098 carat diamond in Botswana in June 2021. It is believed to be the third largest gem-quality stone ever to be mined.

Under the terms of a 2025 signed agreement, Botswana will see its share of diamonds from Debswana grow from 25% to 50%.

== Production ==
Debswana controls all diamond mining in Botswana; there are no private diamond mining operations in the country. Combined production of the company's four mines totalled 30 million carats 6,000 kilograms (13,228 lb), nearly a quarter of the world's annual production of around 130 million carats 26,000 kilograms (57,320 lb). The high value per weight of diamonds mined by Debswana has made the company the leading producer of diamonds by value in the world. Debswana is also the second largest producer by volume.

== Income and profits ==
Year	Income (billions US$)	Carats produced	Income chg/yr.
2011.	1.08	22,900,000	
2012.	0.7	20,200,000	▼35%

== Economic impact ==
Diamond mining activities have fueled much of the growth in Botswana's economy, allowing it to grow from one of the poorest countries in the world when it became independent in 1966 to a "middle income" nation, with $9,200 per capita income in 2004. The country has an agenda of becoming a "high-income" country by 2036. Largely because of this, Botswana is considered by two major investment services to be the safest credit risk in Africa. Diamonds account for approximately one third of the nation's GDP and over 80 percent of earnings from exports, as of 2019. Debswana is the largest non-government employer in the country, employing approximately 6,400 people, of whom over 93 percent are Batswana.

== Criticism ==
=== Human rights ===
Debswana has been criticised by the international indigenous rights organisation, Survival International, for not respecting the human rights of the Bushmen living in Botswana. Since the mid-eighties, Survival International has published reports that the Botswana government has conducted a campaign of harassment to drive them out and give way to mining exploration. Louis Nchindo, former managing director of Debswana, said: "The Government was justified in removing the Basarwa from the Reserve… It is sensible of Government to take such action. Otherwise who would always want to remain in the Dark Ages while others move forward?" According to Stephen Corry, director of Survival International, the Bushmen are not backward or primitive, and their human and cultural rights must be respected. The Botswana government has consistently refuted Survival's claims as exaggerated. There is still no evidence of Debswana mining in the Central Kalahari Game Reserve as the company operates mines elsewhere, at Jwaneng, Orapa, Letlhakane and Damtshaa.

== See also ==
- Diamonds as an investment
- Economy of Botswana
