= List of Botswana-related topics =

This is a list of topics related to Botswana. Those interested in the subject can monitor changes to the pages by clicking on Related changes in the sidebar.

== Botswana ==
- Botswana
- Botswana Railways
- Botswana diplomatic missions
- Sankuyo

== Buildings and structures in Botswana ==
- Morupule Power Station

=== Airports in Botswana ===
- List of airports in Botswana
- Sir Seretse Khama International Airport

=== Archaeological sites in Botswana ===
- Tsodilo

== Communications in Botswana ==
- Botswana Telecommunications Corporation
- Communications in Botswana
- .bw
- List of people on stamps of Botswana

=== Newspapers published in Botswana ===
- Mmegi
- The Voice
- The Botswana Gazette
- The Patriot

== Conservation in Botswana ==
=== National parks of Botswana ===
- List of national parks of Botswana
- Central Kalahari Game Reserve
- Chobe National Park
- Kgalagadi Transfrontier Park
- Khutse Game Reserve
- Makgadikgadi Pans National Park
- Mokolodi Nature Reserve
- Moremi Wildlife Reserve
- Nxai Pan National Park

== Botswana culture ==
- Culture of Botswana
- Badimo
- Cuisine of Botswana
- Coat of arms of Botswana
- Fatshe leno la rona
- Flag of Botswana
- The Gods Must Be Crazy
- Presidents' Day (Botswana)
- Public holidays in Botswana

=== Languages of Botswana ===
- Kgalagadi language
- Ikalanga language
- ǃXóõ language
- Bemba language
- Gǁana language
- Herero language
- Ju languages
- Juǀʼhoan language
- Lozi language
- Nama language
- Shona language
- Shua language
- Sotho languages
- Tsoa language
- Tswana language
- Tuu languages
- ǁAni language
- ǂHõã language
- ǂKxʼauǁʼein language

=== Botswana music ===
- Music of Botswana
- Botswana hip hop
- Tswana music
- Rock and Roll

== Government Parastatals ==
- Botswana Unified Revenue Service
- Companies and Intellectual Property Authority

== Economy of Botswana ==
- Economy of Botswana
- Botswana pula
- Debswana

=== Companies of Botswana ===
- Botswana Telecommunications Corporation
- Choppies
- Consumer Watchdog
- Coalbed methane
- Customized Software
- Impression House
- Mascom
- Moikabi Post
- Orange Botswana
- RVM Properties
- Thebe Botswana Advertiser

=== Mines in Botswana ===
- Damtshaa diamond mine
- Jwaneng diamond mine
- Letlhakane diamond mine
- Morupule Colliery
- Orapa diamond mine
- BCL Mine
- Tati Nickel Mine

=== Trade unions of Botswana ===
==== Botswana Federation of Trade Unions ====
- Air Botswana Employees' Union
- Botswana Agricultural Marketing Board Workers' Union
- Botswana Bank Employees' Union
- Botswana Beverages & Allied Workers' Union
- Botswana Central Bank Staff Union
- Botswana Commercial & General Workers' Union
- Botswana Construction Workers' Union
- Botswana Diamond Sorters & Valuators' Union
- Botswana Federation of Trade Unions
- Botswana Hotel Travel & Tourism Workers' Union
- Botswana Housing Corporation Staff Union
- Botswana Institute of Development Management Workers' Union
- Botswana Manufacturing & Packaging Workers' Union
- Botswana Meat Industry Workers' Union
- Botswana Mining Workers' Union
- Botswana National Development Bank Staff Union
- Botswana Postal Services Workers' Union
- Botswana Power Corporation Workers' Union
- Botswana Private Medical & Health Services Workers' Union
- Botswana Railways Amalgamated Workers' Union
- Botswana Saving Bank Employees' Union
- Botswana Telecommunication Employees' Union
- Botswana Vaccine Institute Staff Union
- Botswana Wholesale, Furniture & Retail Workers' Union
- National Amalgamated Central, Local & Parastatal Manual Workers' Union
- Rural Industry Promotions Company Workers' Union
- University of Botswana Non-Academic Staff Union
- Botswana Teachers' Union

== Education in Botswana ==
- Education in Botswana

=== Botswana educators ===
- Patrick van Rensburg
- Alinah Kelo Segobye
- Sheila Tlou
- Thomas Tlou

=== Schools in Botswana ===
- Maru a Pula School
- Westwood International School

=== Universities and colleges in Botswana ===
- University of Botswana
- St. Joseph's College, Kgale
- Botswana Accountancy College
- Botho University
- Botswana University of Agriculture and Natural Resources
- Botswana International University of Science and Technology
- Institute of Health Services
- Botswana Police College

== Fauna of Botswana ==
- Aardwolf
- African buffalo
- African civet
- African wild dog
- African striped weasel
- Bat-eared fox
- Black-footed cat
- Bongo (antelope)
- Brown hyena
- Cape fox
- Caracal
- Cheetah
- Dik-dik
- Hippopotamus
- Leopard
- Lion
- Plains zebra
- Queen whydah
- Ratel
- Serval
- Spotted hyena

== Geography of Botswana ==
- Geography of Botswana
- ISO 3166-2:BW
- Makgadikgadi Pan
- Okavango Delta
- Omuramba

=== Cities in Botswana ===
- Kokong
- List of cities in Botswana
- Bobonong
- Eesterus
- Francistown
- Gaborone
- Ghanzi
- Gomare
- Gumare
- Hukuntsi
- Jwaneng
- Kang, Botswana
- Kanye, Botswana
- Kasane
- Khoutsiri
- Letlhakane
- Lobatse, Botswana
- Mahalapye
- Masunga
- Maun, Botswana
- Mochudi
- Mogoditshane
- Molepolole
- Moshupa
- Nojane
- Orapa
- Palapye
- Ramokgwebana
- Ramotswa, Botswana
- Selebi-Phikwe, Botswana
- Serowe
- Shoshong
- Sowa, Botswana
- Thamaga
- Tlokweng
- Tonota
- Toteng
- Tshabong
- Tutume
- Ukwi

=== Craters of Botswana ===
- Kgagodi crater

=== Deserts of Botswana ===
- Kalahari Desert

=== Districts of Botswana ===
- Districts of Botswana
- Central District (Botswana)
- Ghanzi District
- Kgalagadi
- Kgatleng District
- Kweneng District
- North-East District (Botswana)
- North-West District (Botswana)
- South-East District (Botswana)
- Southern District (Botswana)

=== Lakes of Botswana ===
- Lake Ngami

=== Old maps of Botswana ===
- Maps of Botswana

=== Rivers of Botswana ===
- Boteti River
- Cuando River
- Khwai River
- Molopo River
- Okavango River
- Thamalakane River

=== Botswana geography stubs ===
- Bobonong
- Boteti River
- Central District (Botswana)
- Central Kalahari Game Reserve
- Cuando River
- Damtshaa diamond mine
- Eesterus
- Ghanzi
- Ghanzi District
- Gomare
- Gumare
- Hukuntsi
- Jwaneng
- Jwaneng diamond mine
- Kang, Botswana
- Kanye, Botswana
- Kasane
- Kgagodi crater
- Kgalagadi
- Kgatleng District
- Khoutsiri
- Khutse Game Reserve
- Khwai River
- Lake Makgadikgadi
- Lake Ngami
- Letlhakane
- Letlhakane diamond mine
- List of national parks of Botswana
- Lobatse, Botswana
- Mahalapye
- Makgadikgadi Pan
- Makgadikgadi Pans National Park
- Masunga
- Mochudi
- Mogoditshane
- Mokolodi Nature Reserve
- Molepolole
- Molopo River
- Moremi Wildlife Reserve
- Nojane
- North-East District (Botswana)
- North-West District (Botswana)
- Nxai Pan National Park
- Omuramba
- Orapa
- Orapa diamond mine
- Palapye
- Ramokgwebana
- Ramotswa, Botswana
- Sankuyo
- Selebi-Phikwe, Botswana
- Serowe
- Sir Seretse Khama International Airport
- South-East District (Botswana)
- Southern District (Botswana)
- Sowa, Botswana
- Tati Concessions Land
- Template:Botswana-geo-stub
- Thamaga
- Thamalakane River
- Tlokweng
- Tonota
- Toteng
- Tshabong
- Tsodilo
- Tutume
- Ukwi

== Government of Botswana ==
- List of commissioners of Bechuanaland
- Heads of government of Botswana
- Heads of state of Botswana
- Festus Mogae
- Vice-President of Botswana
- Parliamentary constituencies of Botswana
- Ministry of Environment, Natural Resource Conservation and Tourism

=== Foreign relations of Botswana ===
- Foreign relations of Botswana

==== Botswana diplomats ====
- Thomas Tlou

== History of Botswana ==
- History of Botswana
- Bechuanaland Protectorate
- List of commissioners of Bechuanaland
- Frederick Thomas Green
- Rulers of Balete (baMalete)
- Rulers of Bangwato (bamaNgwato)
- Rulers of baKgatla
- Rulers of baKwêna
- Rulers of baNgwaketse
- Rulers of baRôlông
- Rulers of baTawana
- Rulers of baTlôkwa
- Setshele I

=== Elections in Botswana ===
- Elections in Botswana
- Botswana general election, 1969
- Botswana general election, 1974
- Botswana general election, 1979
- Botswana general election, 1984
- Botswana general election, 1989
- Botswana general election, 1994
- Botswana general election, 1999
- Botswana general election, 2004
- Botswana general election, 2009
- Botswana general election, 2014
- Botswana general election, 2019

== Military of Botswana ==
- Botswana Defence Force
- Botswana Defence Force Air Wing

== Organisations based in Botswana ==
- The Botswana Scouts Association

=== Political parties in Botswana ===
- List of political parties in Botswana
- Botswana Alliance Movement
- Botswana Congress Party
- Botswana Democratic Party
- Botswana Independence Party
- Botswana National Front
- Botswana People's Party
- International Socialist Organization (Botswana)
- Marx, Engels, Lenin, Stalin Movement
- New Democratic Front

== Botswana people ==
- List of Tswana people
- Khama III
- Mpule Kwelagobe

=== Botswana people by occupation ===
==== Botswana writers ====
- Caitlin Davies
- TJ Dema
- Unity Dow
- Bessie Head
- Moteane Melamu
- Patrick van Rensburg
- Barolong Seboni
- Andrew Sesinyi
- Thomas Tlou

=== Botswana politicians ===
- Gaositwe K.T. Chiepe
- Modise Mokwadi Fly
- Ruth Williams Khama
- Seretse Khama
- Seretse Ian Khama
- Joseph Legwaila
- Quett Masire
- Mokgweetsi Masisi
- Mompati Merafhe
- Peter Mmusi
- Festus Mogae
- Samuel O. Outlule
- Shirley Itumeleng Tiny Segokgo
- Lenyeletse Seretse
- Andrew Sesinyi
- Sheila Tlou

== Politics of Botswana ==
- Politics of Botswana
- Heads of government of Botswana
- Heads of state of Botswana
- List of parliamentary constituencies of Botswana
- National Assembly of Botswana
- Ntlo ya Dikgosi
- Parliament of Botswana
- Vice-President of Botswana

== Religion in Botswana ==
- Christianity in Botswana
- Hinduism in Botswana
- Islam in Botswana
- Roman Catholicism in Botswana

== Botswana society ==
- Child labour in Botswana
- Demographics of Botswana
- Presidents' Day (Botswana)
- Public holidays in Botswana
- The Botswana Scouts Association

=== Ethnic groups in Botswana ===
Bakgalagari Batapo Baritji

- !Kung people
- Bangwato
- Basarwa
- Herero
- Lozi people
- Nama people
- Sotho–Tswana
- Bakalaka
- Bakgatla ba Kgafela
- Bakgatla ba Mmanaana
- Bangwaketse
- Bakwena
- Batawana
- Bayei
- Basubiya
- Barolong
- Bakhurutshe
- Bazezuru
- Bakgalagadi
- Babirwa
- Batswapong
- Northern Ndebele people
- Bangologa
- Bambukushu
- Tswana

== Sport in Botswana ==
- Sport in Botswana
- Botswana at the Olympics
- Botswana at the African Games
- Botswana at the Commonwealth Games

=== Botswana sportspeople ===
==== Botswana athletes ====
- Gable Garenamotse
- Kabelo Kgosiemang
- Tlhalosang Molapisi
- California Molefe
- Obakeng Ngwigwa

==== Botswana boxers ====
- Khumiso Ikgopoleng
- Lechedzani Luza
- France Mabiletsa

==== Botswana footballers ====
- Dipsy Selolwane
- Thatayaone Mothuba

==== Olympic competitors for Botswana ====
- Gable Garenamotse
- Khumiso Ikgopoleng
- Lechedzani Luza
- France Mabiletsa
- California Molefe
- Nijel Amos

=== Football in Botswana ===
- Football in Botswana
- Botswana Football Association
- Botswana national football team
- List of football clubs in Botswana

==== Botswana football clubs ====
- Botswana Defence Force XI
- Gaborone United
- Mogoditshane Fighters
- Amagents Football Club
- Township Rollers F.C.

==== Botswana football competitions ====
- FA Challenge Cup (Botswana)
- Botswana Premier League
- FA Challenge Cup
- Botswana Independence Cup

==== Football venues in Botswana ====
- Botswana National Stadium

=== Botswana at the Olympics ===
- Botswana at the 1992 Summer Olympics
- Botswana at the 1996 Summer Olympics
- Botswana at the 2000 Summer Olympics
- Botswana at the 2004 Summer Olympics
- Botswana at the 2008 Summer Olympics
- Botswana at the 2012 Summer Olympics
- Botswana at the 2016 Summer Olympics
- Botswana at the 2020 Summer Olympics

=== Marathons of Botswana ===
- Gaborone City Marathon

== Transport in Botswana ==
- Transport in Botswana
- Botswana Railways

=== Airlines of Botswana ===
- Air Botswana

== See also ==
- Lists of country-related topics - similar lists for other countries
