= Wildlife of Botswana =

Location of Botswana

The wildlife of Botswana refers to the flora and fauna of this country. Botswana is around 90% covered in savanna, varying from shrub savanna in the southwest in the dry areas to tree savanna consisting of trees and grass in the wetter areas. Even under the hot conditions of the Kalahari Desert, many species survive; in fact the country has more than 2500 species of plants and 650 species of trees. Vegetation and its wild fruits are also extremely important to rural populations living in the desert and are the principal source of food, fuel and medicine for many inhabitants.

Three national parks and seven game reserves stretch over 17% of Botswana's land area. The three national parks are the Chobe National Park, the Nxai Pan and Makgadikgadi National Park and the Kgalagadi Transfrontier Park. The seven game reserves are the Central Kalahari Game Reserve, Gaborone Game Reserve, Khutse Game Reserve, Mannyelanong Game Reserve, Maun Game Reserve and Moremi Game Reserve. In addition, a number of small privately owned reserves are maintained.

== Geography ==
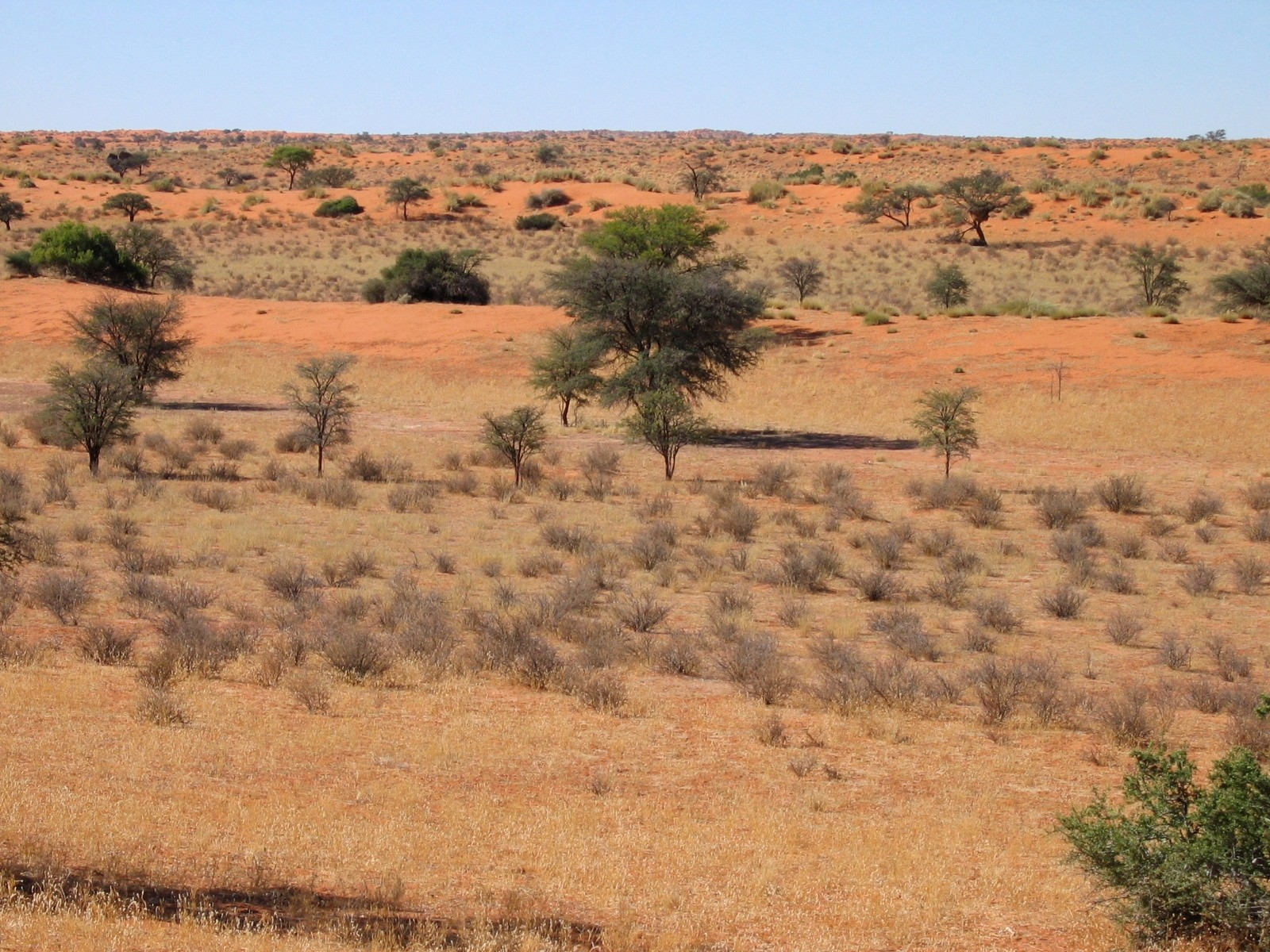
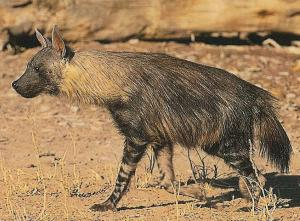
Left: The Kalahari Desert with shrubland vegetation of trees. Right: Brown hyena in the parks and game reserves

The Kalahari Desert, which extends on its western borders into South Africa, Namibia and Angola, is a flat terrain, which covers about 84% of Botswana, known by the epithet "thirstland". It is in fact covered by shrubland vegetation of trees, grasslands, scrub and thorny bushes. Apart from scattered hills and valleys, the dunes system of the southern part contains pans that fill with water during the rains, sustaining the wildlife with its nutrients and grasses.

== National parks and wildlife reserves ==
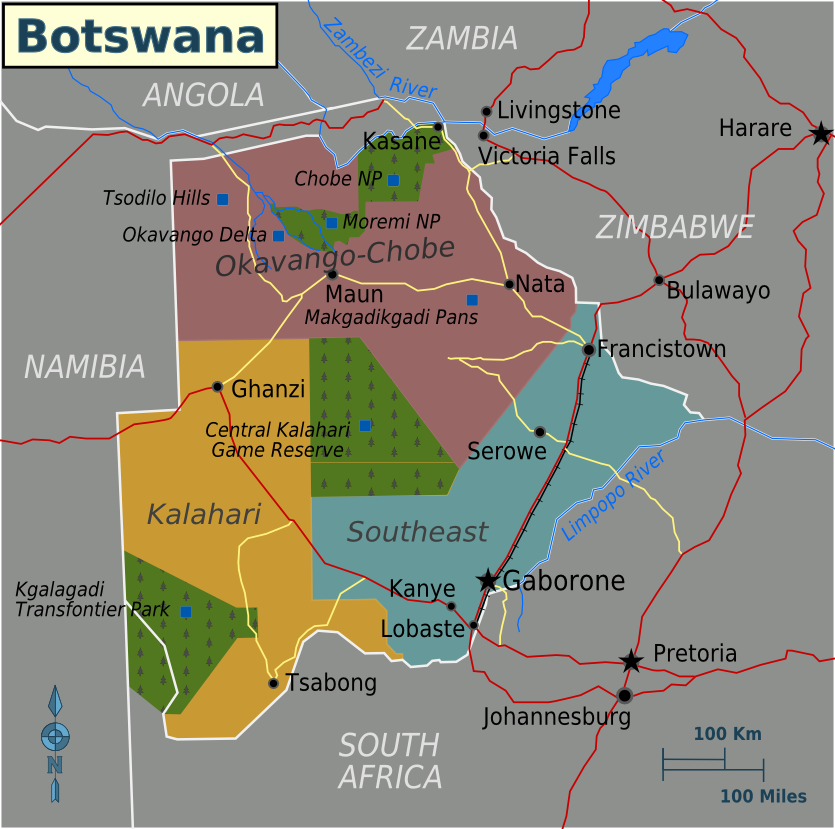

=== Chobe National Park ===
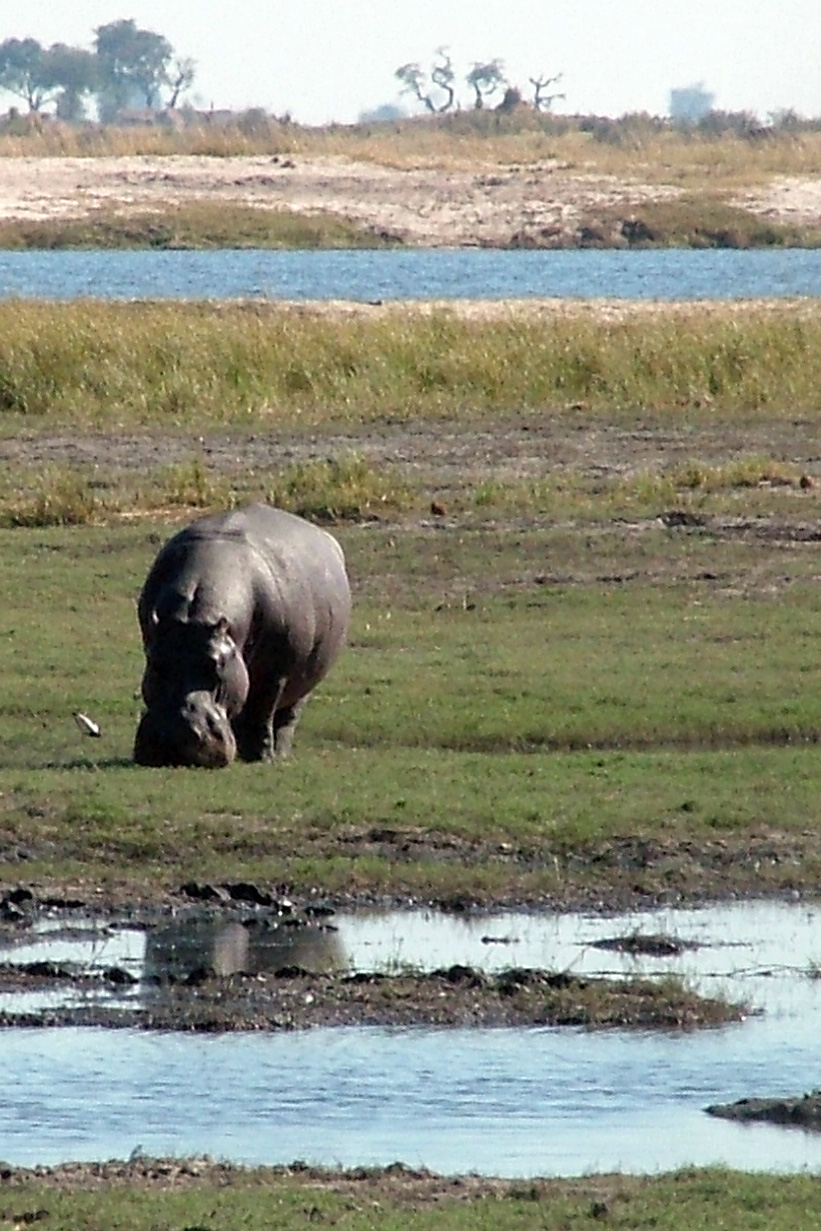
A hippo at a river front in Chobe National Park

Chobe National Park, with its four ecosystems, is known for its largest wildlife concentration in Africa and extends over an area of 10,566 square kilometres (4,080 sq mi). Initially established as a reserve area in 1960 became the first gazetted national park in 1967. Chobe River valley forms the northeast part of the park and has thick forests and lush green plains. The marshland of Savuti forms the western zone. The hinterland is hemmed between the marshland of Savuti on the west and the Linyanti Swamps on its northwest. San people or the Basarwa were the original inhabitants of this land who were hunter gatherers. The park's elephant population is the largest in Botswana, and the animals' seasonal migratory route covers 200 kilometres (120 mi) between the Chobe and Linyanti rivers. The body size of the elephants here is the largest. However, their ivory is brittle and their tusks are generally short. Some of the other faunal species seen here are sable, wildebeest, kudu, buffalo and waterbuck, apart from lion, hyena, jackal, bat-eared fox, cheetah and wild dogs. Also more than 500 bird species have been recorded in Chobe National Park.

=== Kgalagadi Transfrontier Park ===
Kgalagadi Transfrontier Park (KTP), a transboundary park between Botswana and South Africa, was the first conservation area to be set in the southern Kalahari Desert in May 2000. Out of a total area of 38,000 square kilometres (15,000 sq mi), Botswana has control over 28,400 square kilometres (11,000 sq mi) while the balance 9,600 square kilometres (3,700 sq mi) is with South Africa. Two ecological zones of savannahs and grasslands of Africa in semi-arid environment, with least anthropological pressure, are represented here by ungulates and large carnivores mammals. The rich faunal and floral diversity has involved several research projects. Its approach from Goborone involves road travel over a distance of 865 kilometres (537 mi).

=== Makgadikgadi and Nxai National Park ===
The Makgadikgadi and Nxai National Park, which cover a large area of 7,500 square kilometres (2,900 sq mi) were established in the 1970s. They have complementarity in wild life migrations, which necessitated merging the two parks into a single entity. It has the pans of Ntwetwe, Makgadikgadi, Nxai, Baines' Baobabs and Kudiakam.

=== Moremi Game Reserve ===
Moremi Game Reserve is situated on the eastern side of the Okavango Delta and was named after Chief Moremi of the BaTawana tribe. Moremi was designated as a game reserve, rather than a national park, when it was created. This designation meant that the BaSarwa or Bushmen that lived there were allowed to stay in the reserve.

=== Khutse Game Reserve ===
Khutse Game Reserve established in 1971, covering an area of 2,500 square kilometres (970 sq mi) in Bakwena tribal land, has undulating topography of the bush savanna vegetation. It is sparsely populated due to poor water sources and wild life in the mineralised pan system within Khutse has been their major source of sustenance. The wild life of herbivore thrived on grass growing in the pans which in turn has attracted predators.

=== Central Kalahari Game Reserve ===
The Central Kalahari Game Reserve, the second largest reserve in Botswana covering an area of 52,800 square kilometres (20,400 sq mi), is a habitat of open plains, salt pans and riverbeds. It has wooded mopane forests in the south and east. The indigenous people residing here since ancient times are known as bushmen or the Basarwa or San. Its fame is also due to its Deception Valley where the study of brown hyena (Parahyaena brunnea) has been carried out. Deception was the name given to the salt pans of the valley, which gave deceptive sight (mirage) of a water body from a distance. Tree Island used to be the main camping ground here. Cry of the Kalahari, a famous book made this a popular place. Wild animals such as giraffe, brown hyena, warthog, wild dog, cheetah, leopard, lion, blue wildebeest, eland, gemsbok, kudu, red hartebeest and springbok are seen in the pans and valleys, particularly during the period from December to April.

== Communal and private game reserves ==
=== Khama Rhino Sanctuary ===
Khama Rhino Sanctuary was established in 1992, covering 8,585 hectares (21,210 acres) of Kalahari sandveld with Serwe Pan, primarily to protect the rhinos which at that time was listed subject to poaching causing fears of extinction. A community trust was established to protect the black and white rhino species left in the area. There are also 30 other animal species found in this area as well as over 250 bird species. There are many activities that can be taken place while at Khama Rhino Sanctuary these include, game drives, nature walks and rhino tracking. The sanctuary is a community trust governed by a board of trustees who are elected from the local communities of Serowe, Paje and Mabeleapudi. The President of Botswana, Seretse Khama Ian Khama, Paramount Chief of the Bamangwato, is patron of the trust.

=== Mokolodi Park ===
Mokolodi Park spreads over a 10,000 hectares (25,000 acres) area, is a park maintained by the Mokolodi Wildlife Foundation, a private organization, near Gaborone. Its ecosystem has, as result of restocking efforts, witnessed proliferation of many species of wildlife like white rhino, cheetah, mountain reedbuck, giraffe, zebra, red hartebeest, sable, gemsbok, which coexists along with the indigenous fauna such as kudu, impala, hyena, leopard and water buck. The park is developed as nature reserve with extensive network of jeepable (4x4) paths, which permits viewing the wild life at close quarters. The park administration is planning to expand its limits of conservation area up to the Lion Park opposite to Crocodile Pools.

=== Northern Tuli Game Reserve ===
The Northern Tuli Game Reserve is a private reserve covering an area of 46,000 hectares (110,000 acres) made up of savannah plains, riverine forests, open marshland and rugged outcrops of sandstone. It is the largest private reserve in Southern Africa. It has the largest elephant population in the world. In addition, more than 350 species of birds have been reported here. Other fauna of Botswana are also commonly found here.

== Wildlife management areas ==
Wildlife management areas (WMAs) are areas where wildlife utilization is controlled by law. The WMAs often function as buffer areas around wildlife reserves, since most wildlife populations spend extended periods outside of the sanctuaries. The concept was developed in the 1980s. Its purpose is to prevent transformation of land, where wildlife is used commercially, into agricultural land, where wild animals are persecuted or even eradicated. Proposals have been made for 12 WMAs, one of them was rejected by district authorities.

== Flora ==
In Botswana forest cover is around 27% of the total land area, equivalent to 15,254,700 ha (37,695,000 acres) of forest in 2020, down from 18,803,700 ha (46,465,000 acres) in 1990. In 2020, naturally regenerating forest covered 15,254,700 ha (37,695,000 acres), of the naturally regenerating forest 0% was reported to be primary forest (consisting of native tree species with no clearly visible indications of human activity) and around 11% of the forest area was found within protected areas. For the year 2015, 24% of the forest area was reported to be under public ownership and 76% private ownership.

Floral diversity of vegetation in Botswana, which receives only an average annual rainfall of about 450 millimetres (18 in) only, is generally defined under three broad heads namely, hardveld, sandveld and Okavango deltaveld which show seasonal difference in its nutrition value, with woody plants recording higher values compared to the grasses; Panicum has recorded more nutritional content during the rainy season.

Hardveld vegetation consists of woody plants and grasses. The woody plants are; Acacia karroo, Albizia anthelmintica, Balanites aegyptiaca, Mopane (Colophospermum mopane), Combretum apiculatum, Grewia bicolor, Grewia flavecens, Grewia monticola, Lonchocarpus capassa and Terminalia.

Sandveld of the Kalahari desert's vegetation expanse consists of grasses, namely Kragrostis pallens, Striagostis uniplumis, Anthephora pubescens, Schmidtia pappophoreides and Megaloprotachne albescens. Woody plants recorded are the Grewia avellana, Grewia retinervis, Lonchocarpus nelsii and Terminalia sericia.

Okavango deltaveld has both grasses and woody plants. The woody plants are the Ficus verruculosa and the Hyphaene crinata. The grasses reported are the Phragmites communis, Dichanthium papillusum, Panicum repens, Andropogon encomus, Echinochloa pyramidalis and Imperata cylindrica.

Ninety percent of Botswana is savanna. Small areas of forest exist, but only in the far north along the Chobe River. Gruff shrubland tends to grow in the dryer desert areas, whilst trees tend to grow in the swamps, particularly in the Okavango delta which have access to more water to thrive. Botswana is home to over 2500 species of plants and over 650 species of trees.

=== Trees ===
Common trees are the mopane, baobab, marula, acacia, camel thorn, motopi (shepherd's tree), wild date palm, papyrus, sycamore fig tree, real fan palm, African mangosteen and the sausage tree. The trees tend to grow in areas with a plentiful supply of water, such as in the Okavango Delta swamps.

The baobab tree, known as mowana in the Setswana language are some of the long living trees in Botswana and may grow older than 2000 years. The bark is characteristically pinkish-grey in color, with a shiny tint. Large white flowers, averaging about 12 cm across and appear between October and December, whilst the greyish-brown fruits which average about 24 cm in length appear in April–May.

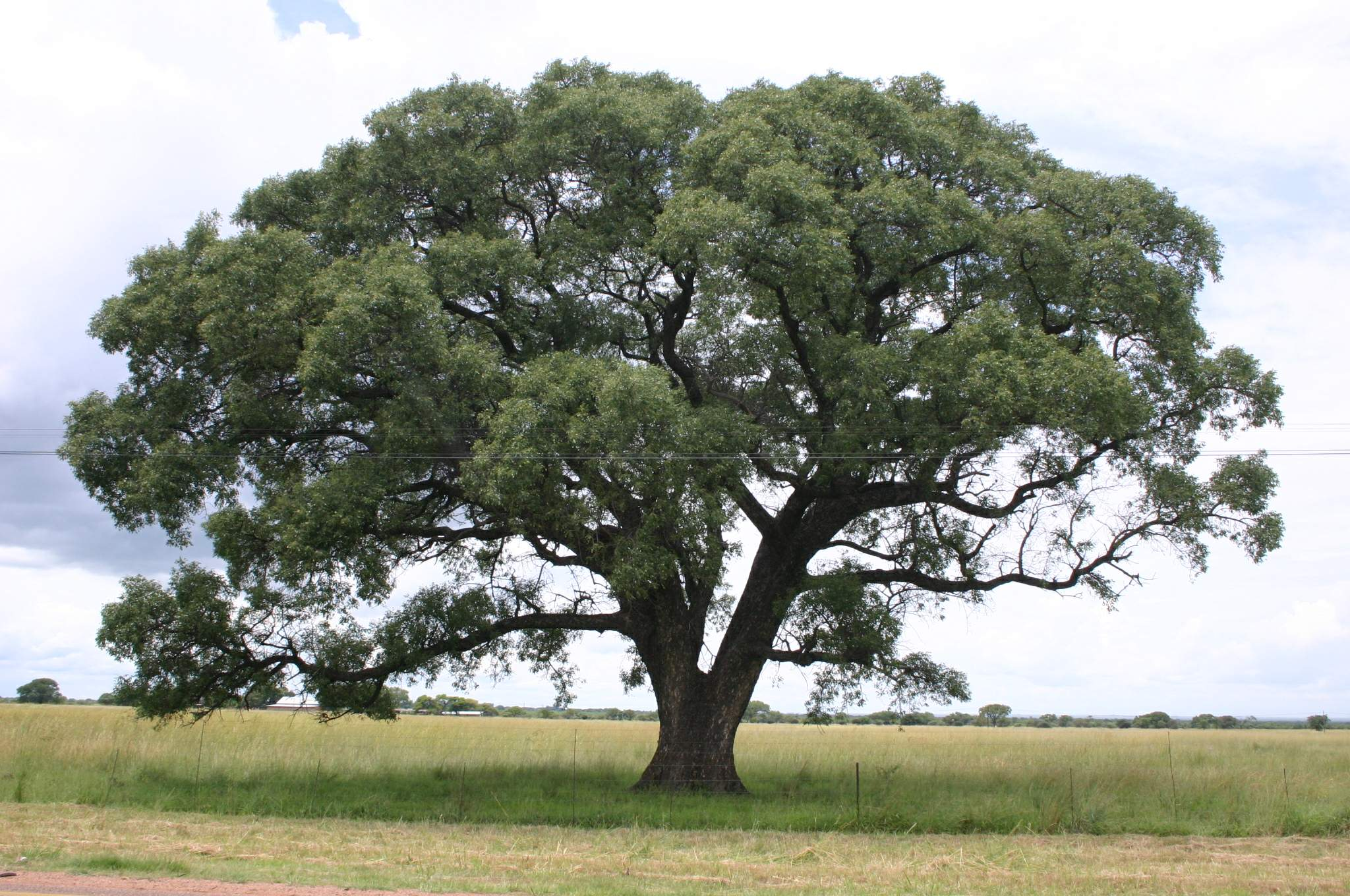
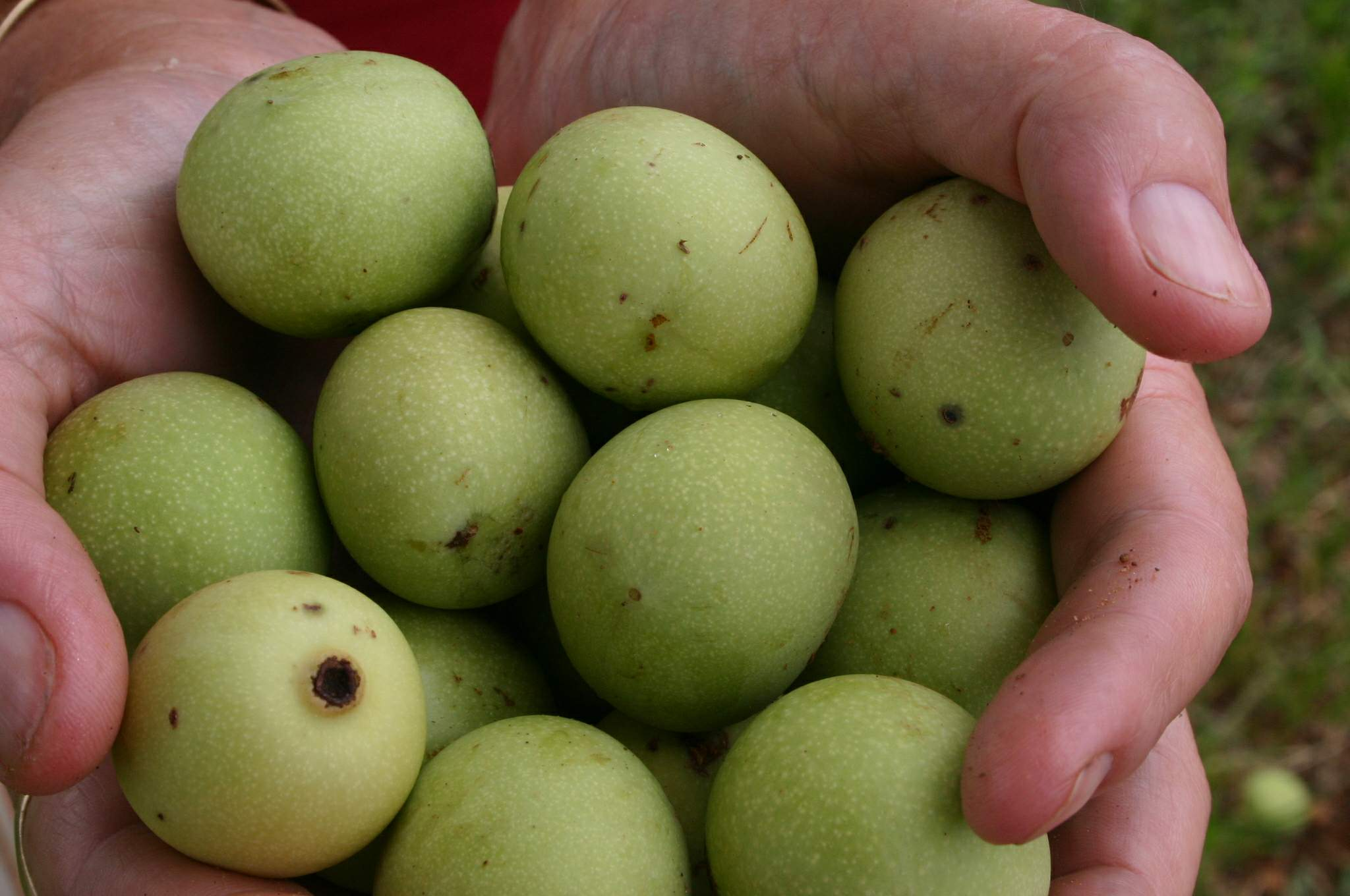
Left: Marula tree. Right: Green fruits of the marula.

The marula or morula tree, belonging to the mango family Anacardiaceae, grows to an average of 15 metres or 49 feet (and up to 20 metres or 66 feet) in the Okavango Delta in bushveld and woodland, and has a greyish bark and is deciduous. From January to July, the leaves are grey-green but eventually turn pale yellow and fall off in the latter part of the year during the winter. During the summer months the trees exhibit round to oval fruit, rich in Vitamin C, with a thick peel covering white slippery pulp, which like the leaves turns increasingly yellow at the end of the blooming season. It also bears flowers, pinkish with male and red-purple and white with female.; the male tends to be larger and borne on sparse drooping racemes.

Wild date palm is one of only two species of palm tree which occur on the Okavango Delta, the other being the real fan palm. The palm, an evergreen, tends to reach a height of around 6 metres (20 ft) and grows in abundance in the swamps in Botswana, along with the papyrus. It exhibits feather-shaped leaves, as compared to the fan-shaped leaves of the real fan palm. The leaves typically grow to about 3–4 metres (9.8–13.1 ft) in length with some soft basal leaflets and others which are dark green and rough in appearance. Male florets of the tree are pale dirty-yellow and caduceus and male florets are smaller, globose and have a greener bluer coloring.

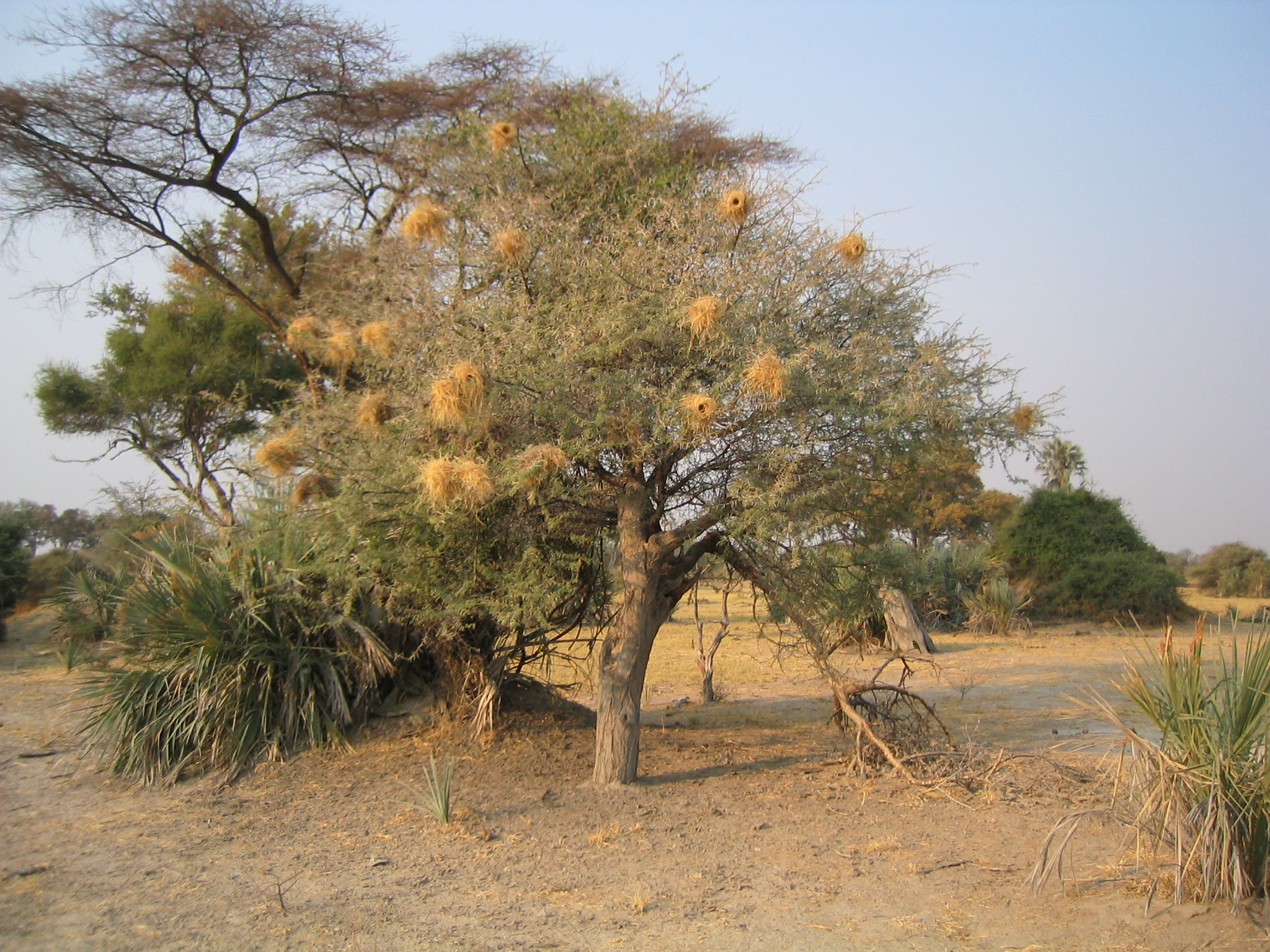
Plocepasser mahali (white-browed sparrow-weaver) nests, within an acacia tree in the Okavango Delta

The sycamore fig tree is one of the largest trees growing in Botswana, typically found in the Okavango delta growing up to 20 metres. A semi-deciduous tree, it has a deeply fluted stem with bright orange bark and grows figs up to 3 cm in diameter which eventually turn pale red to red when mature from green and peak between July and December.

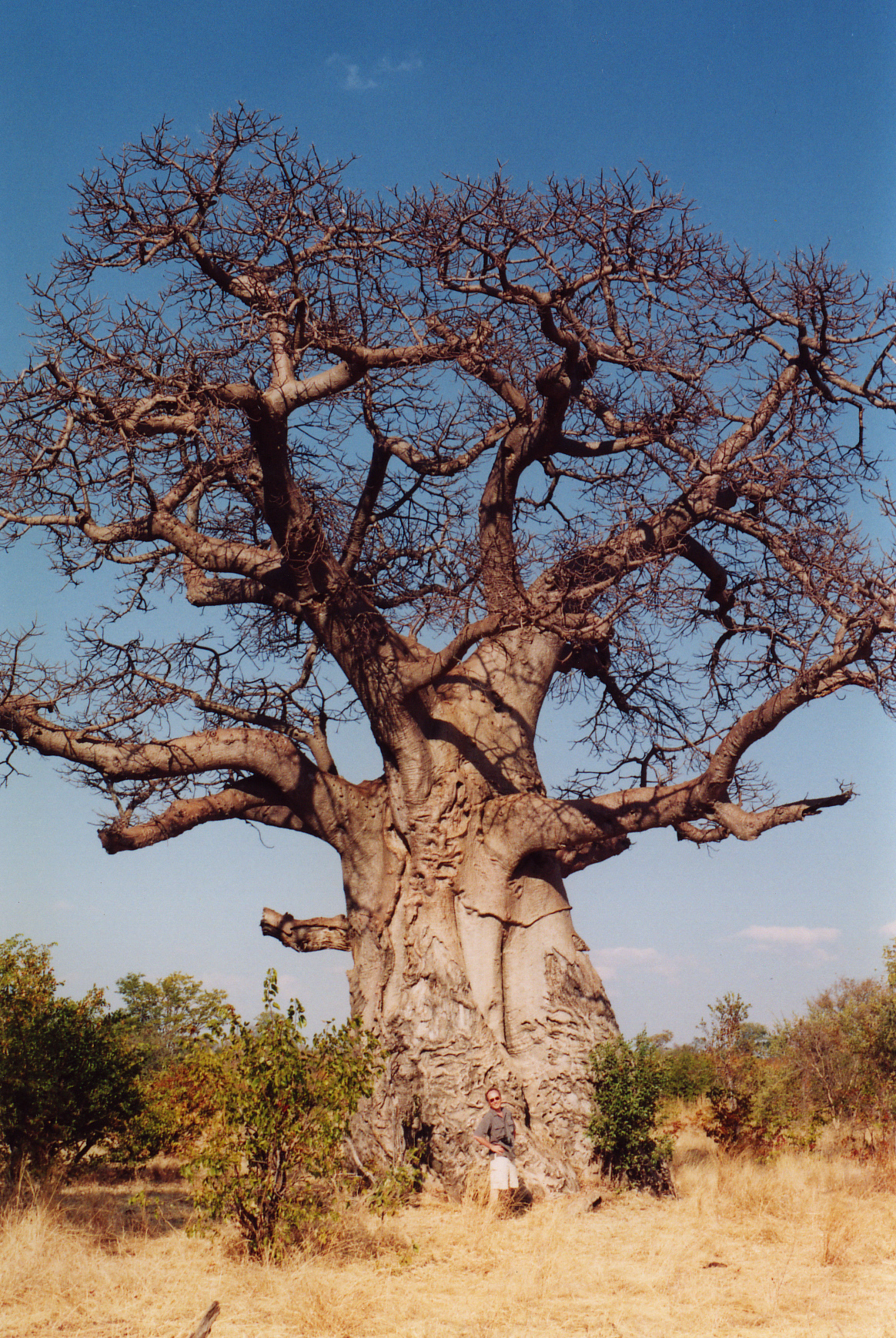
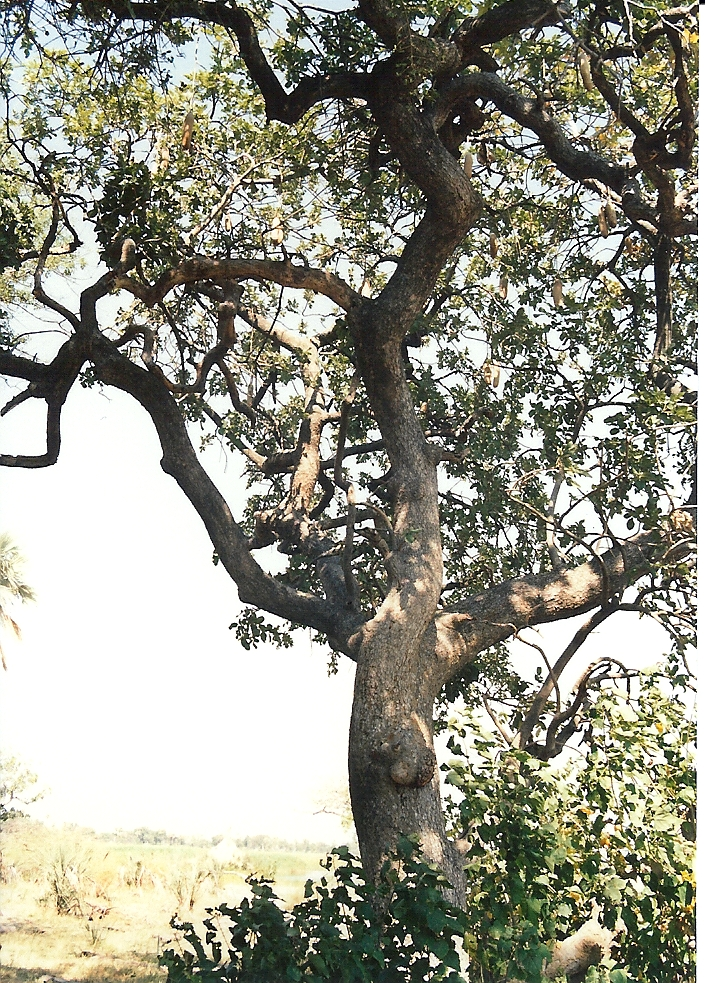
Left: A baobab tree. Right: A sausage tree of the genus Kigelia.

The deciduous water-thriving African mangosteen in Botswana can grow up to 18 metres (59 ft) in height, identifiable by its bare, evenly sectioned yellowish-grey stem which stands out against its dense, very dark crown. The bark is grey in color and the tree sports dark green, shiny leathery leaves averaging 9 centimetres (3.5 in) by 3 centimetres (1.2 in), with a yellow veining are diagnostic. The fruit which the tree bears is oval and of a pinky-orange color, about 2.5 centimetres (0.98 in) in diameter on average and appears from November to February.

The mmilo tree, the species Vangueria infausta of the family Rubiaceae grows is a small deciduous shrub occurring in wooded grassland and bushveld, particular in rocky areas. It exhibits a yellowish-brown drupe, subglobose edible fruit, up to 35 millimetres (1.4 in) in diameter of which the seed is often obtained to create a dish called nchwachwa during the dry winter season.

The species Kigelia africana of sausage tree grows in the Okavango Delta, especially in the Xakanaxa, Third Bridge and Mboma Island areas, and can reach heights of up to 20 metres (66 ft), making it amongst the tallest trees in Botswana. It is noted for its fruits which resemble oversized sausages and can weigh up to 4–5 kg and up to 50 centimetres (20 in) long and 15 centimetres (5.9 in) in diameter. The bark is grey and smooth in younger trees and may exhibit leaves up to 30 centimetres (12 in) long and dark red to maroon cup-shaped flowers measuring 15 by 15 cm, which bloom in August to October.

== Fauna ==
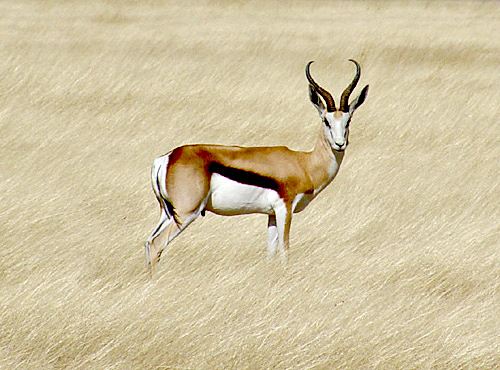
Springbok antelope

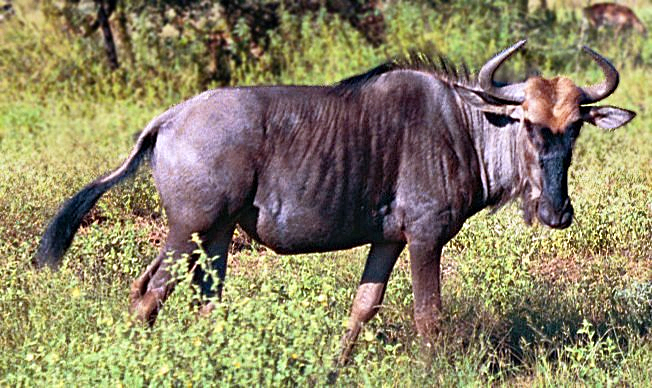
Wildebeest

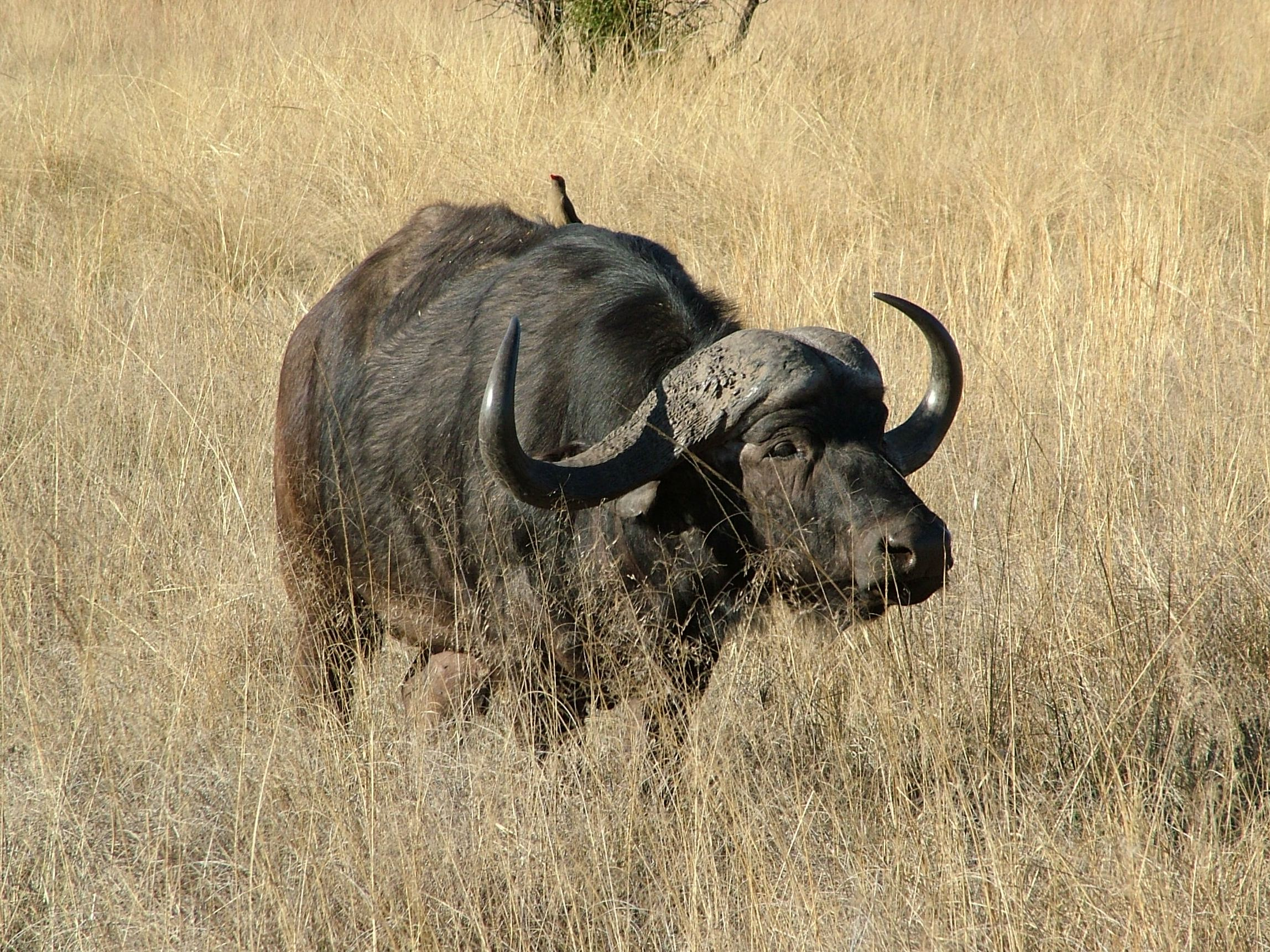
African buffalo

Eight bird species, out of the 593 reported, are considered globally threatened. The eastern cattle egret (Bubulcus coromandus, syn. Bubulcus ibis coromandus) is the national bird of Botswana.

=== Mammals ===
Mammals found in Botswana include aardwolf, African bush elephant, African civet, African golden cat, African striped weasel, banded mongoose, bat-eared fox, black-footed cat, blue duiker, bongo (antelope), brown hyena, Burchell's zebra, bushbuck, African buffalo, Cape fox, Cape hyrax, Cape wild dog, caracal, South African cheetah, common duiker, common eland, gemsbok, giant sable antelope, Angolan giraffe, greater kudu, ground pangolin, hartebeest, hippopotamus, impala, Kirk's dik-dik, klipspringer, lechwe, African leopard, lion, mountain zebra, oribi, roan antelope, sable antelope, serval, Sharpe's grysbok, sitatunga, southern reedbuck, south-central black rhinoceros, spotted hyena, springbok antelope, steenbok, topi, common warthog, waterbuck, wildebeest, yellow-backed duiker, yellow mongoose, marsh mongoose and meerkat.

=== Birds ===
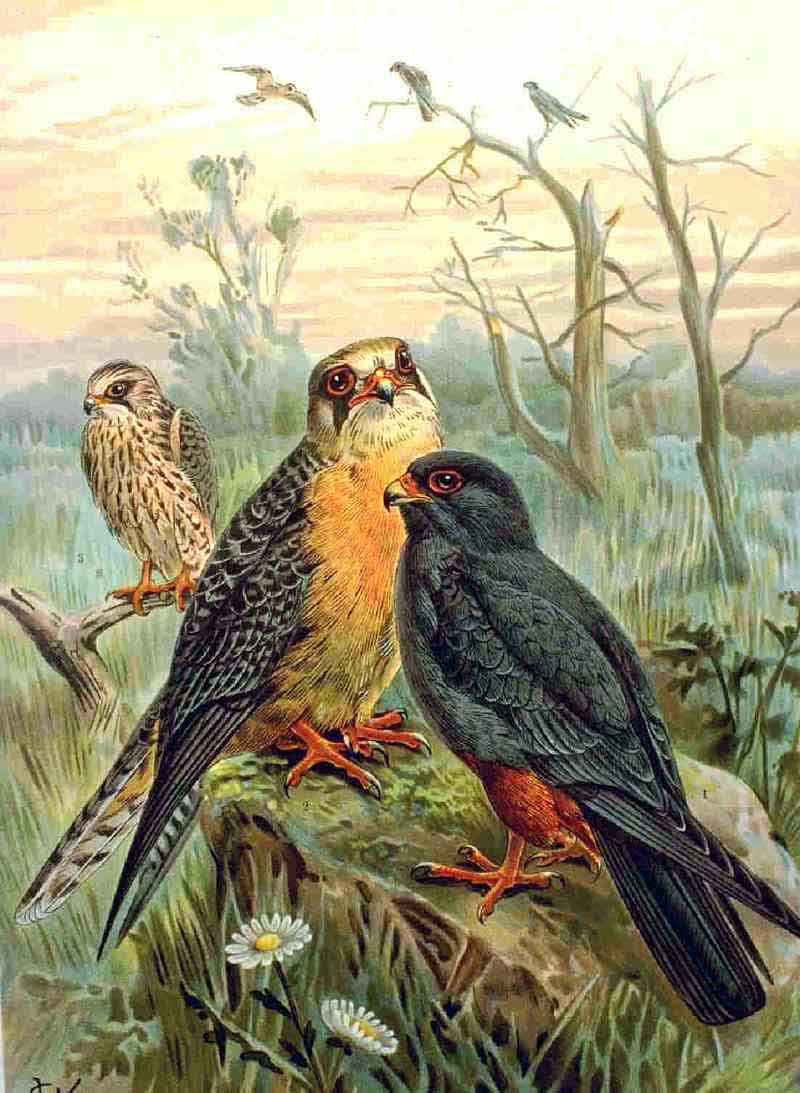
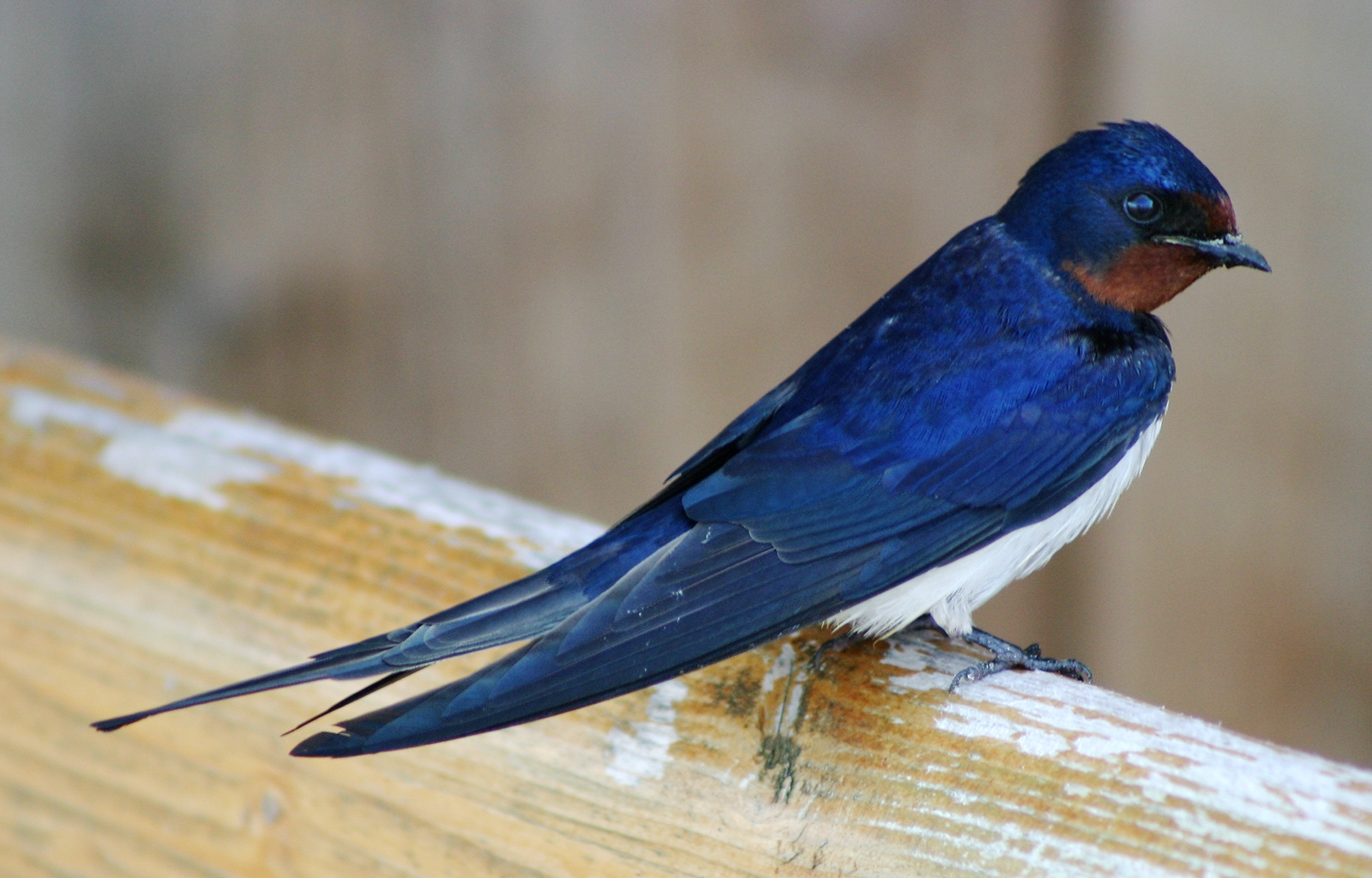
Left: Red-footed falcons. Right: Barn swallow (Hirundo rustica).

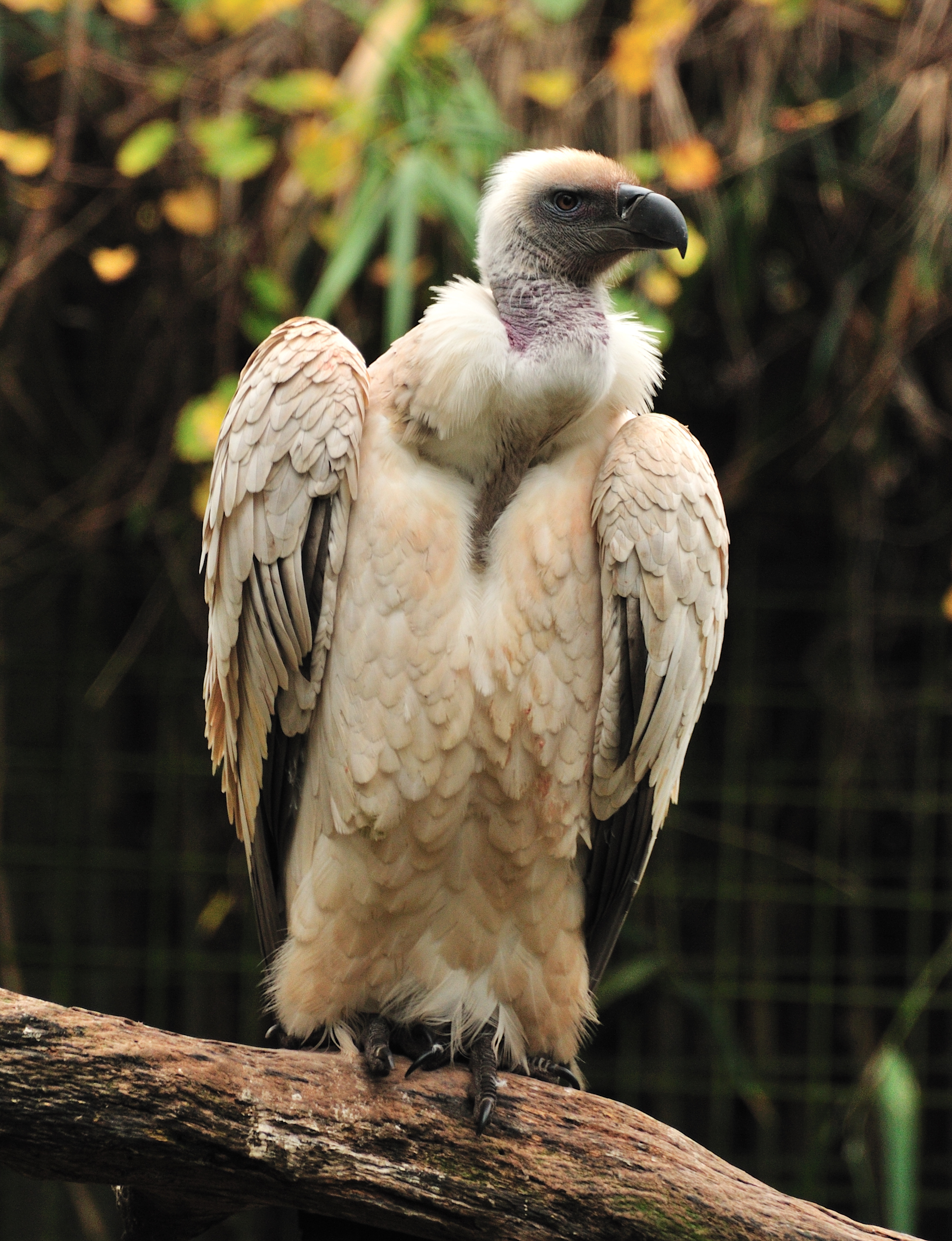
Cape vulture or gyps in a zoo

The twelve important ornithological sites selected in Botswana of which seven are wetlands and which are recognized and supported by the BirdLife International known for their bird life cover more than 25% of the land surface of the country. These parks are: The Chobe National Park; the Linyanti Swamp along the Chobe River; the Okavango Delta, the Lake Ngami; the Makgadikgadi Pans; the Central Kalahari; the Manyelanong Hill; the Tswapong Hills; the Boka Dam; the Phakalane Sewage Lagoons; the Southeast Botswana; and the Gemsbok National Park. An initiative started by the IBA is of setting up 'Site Support Groups' (SSGs), an organised group of local people with the objective to "sustain biodiversity to sustain livelihoods in rural Botswana"; there are 150 SSGs in important bird areas reported to be functioning throughout Africa. Red-footed falcon (Falco vespertinus), amur falcon (Falco amurensis) and barn swallow (Hirundo rustica) and Cape vulture (Gyps coprotheres) are some of the birds reported by IBA from the grasslands, wetlands, hills, in areas of Kalahari Highveld, deltas and around lakes created by dams.

The Botswana Bird Club (BBC) established in 1980, now renamed as BirdLife Botswana promotes ornithological knowledge and interest and also publishes a biannual journal called The Babbler and a quarterly newsletter known as The Familiar Chat dealing with all issues of bird conservation, research and training in Botswana.

Manyelanong Game Reserve's small cliffs protect a breeding colony of Cape vultures, the largest such colony in Botswana and hence called the "Otse Vulture Colony" as its vultures are an endangered species protected by law. Protection has enabled the species to proliferate; its numbers in recent years are 70 breeding pairs seen in the colony.

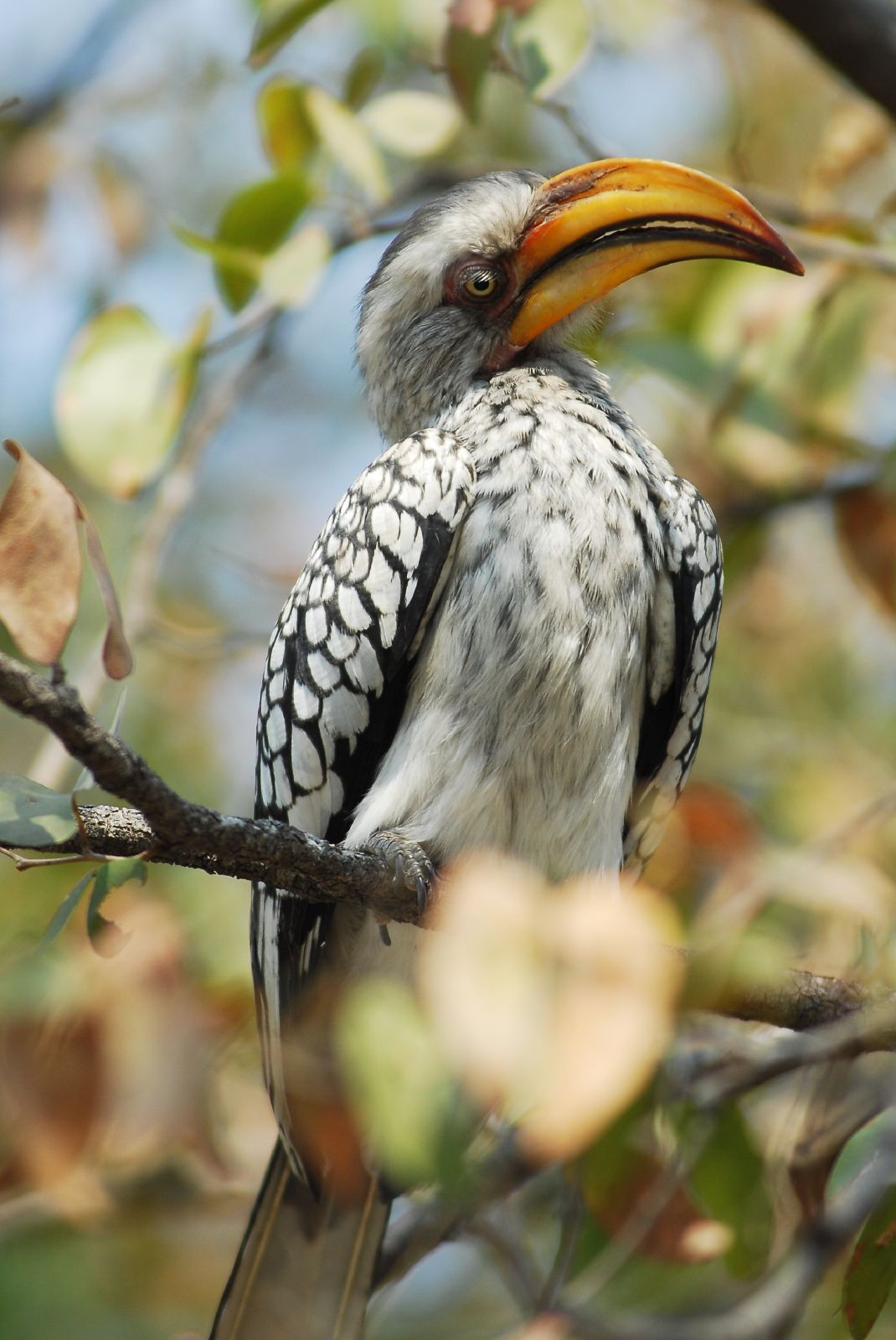
Tockus leucomelas, the southern yellow-billed hornbill in Moremi Game Reserve

Nata Bird Sanctuary

Nata Bird Sanctuary, established in the early 1990s, is situated to the far northeastern edge of Sowa Pan. It encompasses an area of 230 square kilometres (89 sq mi) and maintained as a community project to preserve its 165 bird species. Some of the species reported are the kingfishers, bee-eaters, eagles, bustards and ostriches. Water birds of Africa flock to this place during winter; the bird species reported are teal, ducks, geese, pelicans, spoonbills, greater flamingo and lesser flamingo. The flamingos and pelicans also breed here.

=== Molluscs ===
From 1854 to 2023, 63 native species of molluscs (13 bivalves, 24 freshwater snails, 24 land snails and two slugs) have been recorded in 43 genera and 21 families. There are also four introduced species: Cornu aspersum, Lissachatina fulica, Physella acuta and Radix auricularia, which are potentially invasive and of economic concern. The majority of species occur in the regions of the Okavango Delta and the Chobe–Linyanti–Kwando river system along East Caprivi

=== Butterflies and moths ===
There are some 370 species of Lepidoptera recorded in Botswana, with over 250 species of butterflies and 115 species of moths.

Gaborone Game Reserve

Gaborone Game Reserve, near the city of Gaborone, has a small area of 600 hectares (1,500 acres) but provides for popular viewing along roads. It has plenty of birds and wild life in its precincts The reserve is habitat of thorn scrub and woodland to riverine forest and marshland which attracts a wide variety of birds such as raptors a snake eagle, crimson boubou (a genus of brightly coloured, carnivorous passerine bird) and gallinule. Faunal species seen here are the rhino, impala, kudu, ostriches, wildebeest, zebra, gemsbok, bushbuck, springbok, duiker the giant eland (Taurotragus derbianus also known as the Lord Derby eland), which is Africa's largest antelope.

Moremi Game Reserve

Moremi Game Reserve, established in 1965 and expanded over the years and now covering an area of 4,871 square kilometres (1,881 sq mi), it is the habitat of mopane woodland and acacia forests, floodplains and lagoons. It is said to be one of the most beautiful reserves in Africa maintained by the Department of Wildlife and National Parks. Birdlife in the park is wide and of varied species; water birds to shy forest dwellers are commonly seen. Other wild life fauna such as elephants, hippos (found in large number in the Hippo Pool), a few rhino and the red lechwe. Moremi is also particularly well known for its African wild dog sightings.
