= Scouting and Guiding in Botswana =

Scouting and Guiding associations in Botswana

Scouting has a growing tradition in Botswana. The Scout and Guide movement in Botswana is served by

- Botswana Girl Guides Association, member of the World Association of Girl Guides and Girl Scouts
- The Botswana Scouts Association, member of the World Organization of the Scout Movement
