= Lists of people from African Union states =

Lists of people from African Union states are lists of people from each state of the African Union.

== Alphabetical list ==
- List of Angolans
- List of Botswana-related topics
- List of Burkinabes
- List of Burundian people
- List of Cameroonians
- List of Cape Verdeans
- List of Chadians
- List of Comorians
- List of people from the Democratic Republic of the Congo
- List of people from the Republic of the Congo
- List of Egyptians
- List of Eritreans
- List of Ethiopians
- List of Ghanaians
- List of Bissau-Guineans
- List of Ivorians
- List of Kenyans
- List of people from Lesotho
- List of Liberians
- List of Libyans
- List of Malawians
- List of Malians
- List of Mauritians
- List of Moroccans
- List of Mozambicans
- List of Namibians
- List of Nigerians
- List of Rwandans
- List of Senegalese
- List of Sierra Leoneans
- List of Somalis
- List of South Africans
- List of Sudanese
- List of Tanzanians
- List of Tswana people
- List of Ugandans
- List of Zambians
- List of Zimbabweans
