= BEU =

BEU is a three-letter acronym that may stand for:

- British Empire Union, a historical union formed in the United Kingdom during World War I to support British goods
- Bank Employees' Union (disambiguation), any of several trade unions
- Bedourie Airport, with IATA code BEU
- Biker Enforcement Unit, a division of the Ontario Provincial Police's organized crime section
- Bitlis Eren University, a public university in Bitlis, Turkey
- Bundesstelle für Eisenbahnunfalluntersuchung or Federal Authority for Railway Accident Investigation, German agency investigating railway accidents.

Beu may refer to:

- Beu, a Romanian village administered by Miercurea Nirajului
- Beu (river), a river in southwestern Romania
- The Beu Sisters, an American pop-rock girl group
