= List of protected areas of Botswana =

This is a list of protected areas in Botswana.

== Peace parks ==
- Greater Mapungubwe Transfrontier Conservation Area

== National parks ==
- Chobe National Park
- Kgalagadi Transfrontier Park
- Makgadikgadi Pans
- Nxai Pan National Park

== Other protected areas ==
- Central Kalahari Game Reserve
- Khutse Game Reserve
- Linyanti Swamp
- Mashatu Game Reserve
- Mokolodi Nature Reserve
- Moremi Game Reserve
- Okavango Delta
- Savuti Channel and Savute Marsh

== See also ==
- Game reserve
- List of national parks
- List of national parks in Africa
