= Ronald Baipidi =

Motswana trade unionist

president of the Botswana Federation of Trade Unions
- Incumbent
- Assumed office 1997

Personal details
- Born: Botswana
- Political party: Botswana Democratic Party.

Ronald Baipidi is a Motswana trade unionist. Baipidi has been the president of the Botswana Federation of Trade Unions, which is the largest trade union in Botswana, since 1997. In 2005, Baipidi met with Chinese trade unionists to discuss cooperation between the two organizations.

In a meeting of Union leaders at an economic workshop on trade and related issues in 2007 Baipidi likened the European Union Economic Partnership Agreements to another Scramble for Africa, accusing the plan as a means of underdevelopment in Africa. He also stated that through the Africa Growth and Opportunity Act the United States had already positioned itself to similarly exploit the developing world.

== Sources ==
- BOPA Daily News, 22 August 2005, "BFTU leader enjoys serving people"
- People's Daily Online, 26 April, 2005, "Chinese trade unions to enhance ties with Botswana's counterparts"
