= Public holidays in Botswana =

- Observed by: Batswana
- Type: National
- Frequency: Annual

Public holidays in Botswana are largely controlled by government sector employers who are given paid time off. The government holiday schedule mainly benefits employees of government and government regulated businesses. At the discretion of the employer, other non-federal holidays such as Christmas Eve are common additions to the list of paid holidays.

Major Christian holidays such as Christmas and Good Friday are officially observed, leave is permitted for other religious holidays as well. For example, some school children and employees take days off for Muslim holidays, Hindu holidays, or Eastern Orthodox observances according to the Julian calendar. While not normally taken off work, Valentine's Day, Halloween, Mother's Day, and Father's Day are traditionally observed by the Batswana.

== Public holidays ==
A public holiday (also known as "stats" or "general" or "statutory" holiday) in Botswana is legislated through the parliament of Botswana. Most workers, public and private, are entitled to take the day off with regular pay. However, some employers may require employees to work on such a holiday, but the employee must either receive a day off in lieu of the holiday or must be paid at a premium rate – usually 1½ (known as "time and a half") or twice (known as "double time") the regular pay for their time worked that day, in addition to the holiday pay.

== Nationwide public holidays in Botswana ==
| Date | Name | Remarks |
|---|---|---|
| 1-2 January | New Year's Day | Celebrates the first day of every year in the Eastern calendar. |
| March or April | Good Friday | Commemorates the crucifixion of Jesus. (Note: Non-federally regulated employers must give either Good Friday or Easter Monday as a statutory holiday, though some give both days.) |
| March or April (Note: Date varies because of Western and Eastern Christianity.) | Easter Monday | Celebrates the resurrection of Jesus Christ from the dead. (Note: Non-federally regulated employers must give either Good Friday or Easter Monday as a statutory holiday, though some give both days.) |
| 1 May | Labour Day | Celebrate the achievements of workers. |
| May or June (Note: Date varies because of Western and Eastern Christianity.) | Ascension Day | Commemorates the bodily Ascension of Jesus into heaven. |
| 1 July | Sir Seretse Khama Day | Celebrate birth of the first president. |
| Third Monday and Tuesday in July | Presidents' Day | A one-day holiday held on the third Monday and Tuesday in July. |
| 30 September | Botswana Day | The date celebrates Botswana's Declaration of Independence from the United Kingdom on September 30, 1966. |
| 25 December | Christmas Day | Celebrates the Nativity of Jesus. |
| 26 December | Boxing Day | Celebrated on the day following Christmas Day, when servants and tradesmen would traditionally receive gifts known as a "Christmas box" from their masters, employers or customers. |

== Holidays with religious and cultural significance ==
The religious and cultural holidays in Botswana are characterized by a diversity of religious beliefs and practices.

=== Christian holidays ===
Some private businesses and certain other institutions are closed on Good Friday. The financial market and stock market is closed on Good Friday. Most retail stores remain open although some might close early. Public schools and most universities are closed on Good Friday, either as a holiday of its own, or part of spring break. The postal service operates, and banks regulated by the federal government do not close for Good Friday.

Many companies, including banks, malls, shopping centers and most private retail stores that normally open on Sundays are closed on Easter.

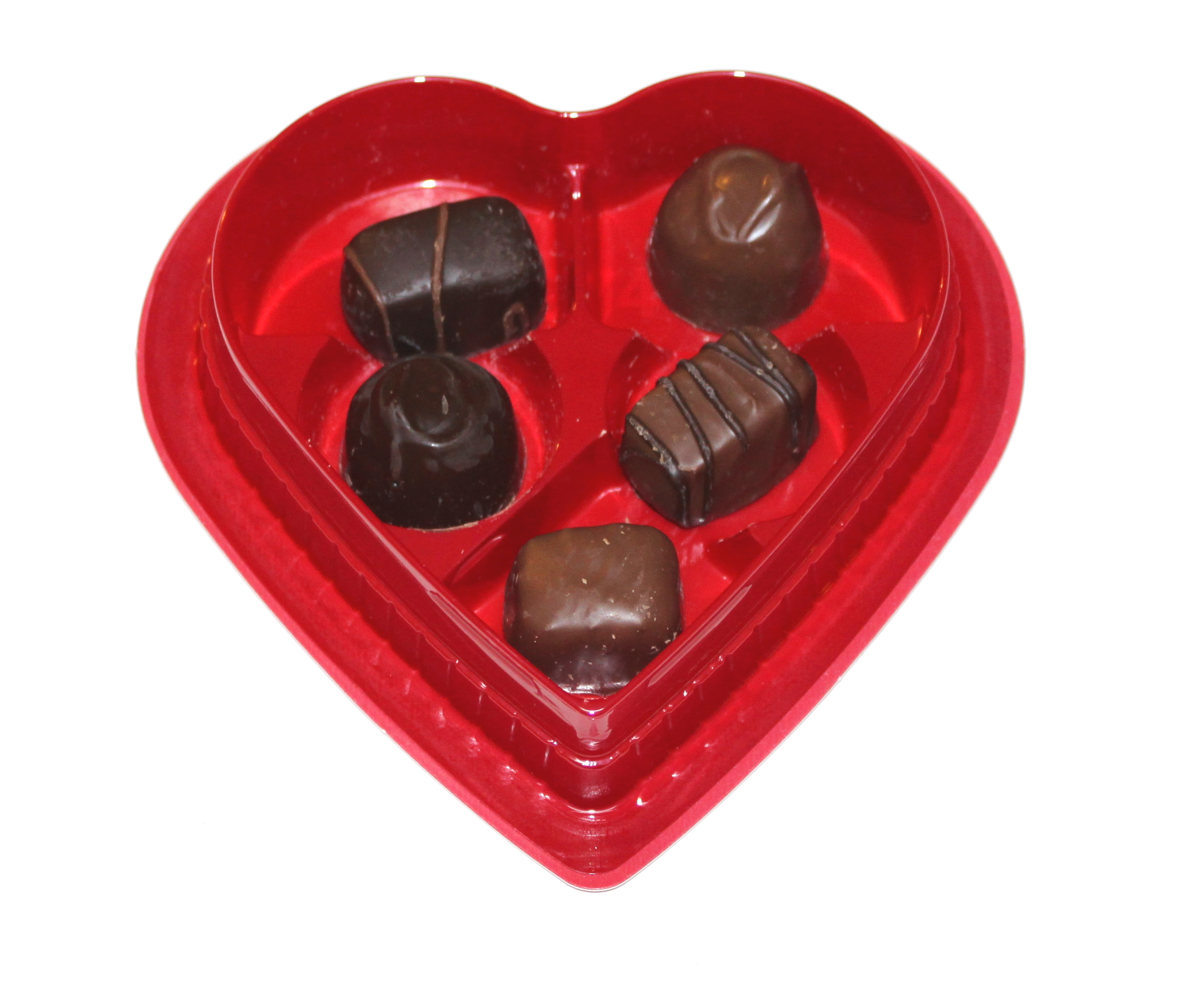
Box of Valentine chocolates, typically sold around Valentine's Day

| Date | Name | Remarks |
|---|---|---|
| 14 February | Valentine's Day | St. Valentine's Day, or simply Valentine's Day is named after one or more early Christian martyrs named Saint Valentine, and was established by Pope Gelasius I in 496 AD. Modern traditional celebration of love and romance, including the exchange of cards, candy, flowers, and other gifts. |
| February or March, date varies | Ash Wednesday | Closes with Ash Wednesday (40 days before Easter, not counting Sundays), which starts the penitential season of Lent in the Western Christian calendar. |
| Sunday before Easter | Palm Sunday | Celebration to commemorate the entry of Jesus into Jerusalem. |
| The Friday before (Eastern) Easter | Good Friday | Friday of Holy Week, when Western Christians commemorate the crucifixion and death of Jesus. Federal banks and post offices that are located in buildings that close for Good Friday and Easter will also be closed. Many public and private schools, colleges, universities and private-sector businesses; and the Botswana Stock Exchange and financial markets are closed on Good Friday. |
| Sunday following the Paschal Full Moon, date varies from 22 March to 25 April, inclusive (see Computus), | Easter | Celebration of the resurrection of Jesus in most Western Christian churches. Many of the Batswana decorate hard-boiled eggs and give baskets of candy, fruit, toys and so on, especially to children; but gifts of age-appropriate Easter baskets for the elderly, the infirm and the needy are increasingly popular. Not a federal holiday due to the fact that it always falls on a Sunday, which is a non-working day for federal and state employees. Many companies that are normally open on Sunday close for Easter. |
| 31 October | Halloween | Originally the end of the Celtic harvest season, it now celebrates the Eve of All Saints' Day. Decorations include jack o'lanterns. Costume parties and candy such as candy corn are also part of the holiday. Kids go "trick-or-treating" to neighbors who give them candy. |
| 24 December | Christmas Eve | Day before Christmas. Virtually every business closes early, though a few remain open 24 hours. |
| 31 December | New Year's Eve | Day before New Year. Virtually every business closes early, though a few remain open 24 hours. |

== See also ==
- Easter controversy
