= Botswana Agricultural Marketing Board Workers' Union =

Trade union in Botswana

BAMBWU
- Agricultural Marketing Board
- Headquarters: Gaborone, Botswana
- Location: Botswana
- Key people: Edwin Molatlhegi, general secretary
- Affiliations: BFTU

The Botswana Agricultural Marketing Board Workers' Union (BAMBWU) is a trade union affiliate of the Botswana Federation of Trade Unions in Botswana.
