= Bank Employees' Union =

The Bank Employees' Union is the name of:

- Bank Employees' Union (Finland), a former trade union
- Bank Employees' Union (Trinidad and Tobago), a former trade union
- Botswana Bank Employees' Union, a trade union
- Australian Bank Employees' Union or ABEU, now part of the Finance Sector Union
