= Botswana Housing Corporation Staff Union =

Trade union in Botswana

BHSCU
- Botswana Housing Corporation Staff Union
- Headquarters: Gaborone, Botswana
- Location: Botswana
- Key people: Felistus Keleeme, general secretary
- Affiliations: BFTU

The Botswana Housing Corporation Staff Union (BHCSU) is a trade union affiliate of the Botswana Federation of Trade Unions in Botswana.
