= Rural Industry Promotions Company Workers' Union =

Trade union in Botswana

RIPCWU
- Rural Industry Promotions Company Workers' Union
- Location: Botswana
- Affiliations: BFTU

The Rural Industry Promotions Company Workers' Union (RIPCWU) is a trade union affiliate of the Botswana Federation of Trade Unions in Botswana.
