= Air Botswana Employees' Union =

Trade union affiliate in Botswana

ABEU
- Air Botswana Employees' Union
- Headquarters: Gaborone, Botswana
- Location: Botswana
- Key people: Violet Chebani, general secretary
- Affiliations: BFTU

The Air Botswana Employees' Union (ABEU) represents workers at Air Botswana. It is a trade union affiliate of the Botswana Federation of Trade Unions in Botswana.
