= Botswana Commercial & General Workers' Union =

Trade union in Botswana

BCGWU
- Botswana Commercial & General Workers' Union
- Headquarters: Gaborone, Botswana
- Location: Botswana
- Key people: Goitsimang Lebekwa, general secretary
- Affiliations: BFTU

The Botswana Commercial & General Workers' Union (BCGWU) is a trade union affiliate of the Botswana Federation of Trade Unions in Botswana.
