= Botswana Diamond Sorters & Valuators' Union =

Trade union in Botswana

BDSVU
- Botswana Diamond Sorters & Valuators' Union
- Headquarters: Gaborone, Botswana
- Location: Botswana
- Fields: Diamond industry of Botswana
- Key people: Edward Keloneilwe, general secretary
- Affiliations: BFTU

The Botswana Diamond Sorters & Valuators' Union (BDSVU) is a trade union affiliate of the Botswana Federation of Trade Unions.
