= Botswana Institute of Development Management Workers' Union =

Trade union in Botswana

BDMWU
- Botswana Institute of Development Management Workers' Union
- Headquarters: Gaborone, Botswana
- Location: Botswana
- Key people: Bontle Keitumetsi, general secretary
- Affiliations: BFTU

The Botswana Institute of Development Management Workers' Union (BDMWU) is a trade union affiliate of the Botswana Federation of Trade Unions in Botswana.
