= Botswana Construction Workers' Union =

Trade union in Botswana

BCWU
- Botswana Construction Workers' Union
- Headquarters: Gaborone, Botswana
- Location: Botswana
- Key people: Candy Keabile, general secretary
- Affiliations: BFTU

The Botswana Construction Workers' Union (BCWU) is a trade union affiliate of the Botswana Federation of Trade Unions in Botswana.
