= Botswana Telecommunication Employees' Union =

Trade union in Botswana

BOTEU
- Botswana Telecommunication Employees' Union
- Headquarters: Gaborone, Botswana
- Location: Botswana
- Key people: Ethopha Mokeresete, general secretary
- Affiliations: BFTU

The Botswana Telecommunication Employees' Union (BOTEU) is a trade union representing workers at the Botswana Telecommunications Corporation. It is an affiliate of the Botswana Federation of Trade Unions in Botswana.
