= Botswana Manufacturing & Packaging Workers' Union =

Trade union in Botswana

- Headquarters: Gaborone, Botswana
- Location: Botswana
- Key people: Keitumetse Sebudi, executive secretary
- Affiliations: Botswana Federation of Trade Unions

The Botswana Manufacturing & Packaging Workers' Union is a trade union affiliate of the Botswana Federation of Trade Unions in Botswana.
