= Botswana Wholesale, Furniture & Retail Workers' Union =

Trade union affiliate in Botswana

BWF&RWU
- Botswana Wholesale, Furniture & Retail Workers' Union
- Headquarters: Gaborone, Botswana
- Location: Botswana
- Key people: Mbusewa Kenalemang, general secretary
- Affiliations: BFTU

The Botswana Wholesale, Furniture & Retail Workers' Union (BWF&RWU) is a trade union affiliate of the Botswana Federation of Trade Unions in Botswana.
