= Botswana Mining Workers' Union =

Trade union in Botswana

- "Unity is Strength"
- Abbreviation: BMWU
- Founded: 1970 (Official registration)
- Founded at: Francistown
- Headquarters: Selebi-Phikwe, Botswana
- Location: Botswana
- General Secretary: Mbiganyi Gaekgotswe
- Affiliations: BFTU
- Website: bmwu.org.bw

The Botswana Mining Workers' Union (BMWU) is a trade union affiliate of the Botswana Federation of Trade Unions in Botswana.
