= Botswana Hotel Travel & Tourism Workers' Union =

Trade union in Botswana

BHT&TWU
- Botswana Hotel Travel & Tourism Workers' Union
- Headquarters: Selibe Phikwe, Botswana
- Location: Botswana
- Key people: Kebabone Kgositlou, chairperson
- Affiliations: BFTU

The Botswana Hotel Travel & Tourism Workers' Union (BHT&TWU) is a trade union affiliate of the Botswana Federation of Trade Unions in Botswana.
