= Botswana Beverages & Allied Workers' Union =

Trade union in Botswana

BB&AWU
- Botswana Beverages & Allied Workers' Union
- Headquarters: Gaborone, Botswana
- Location: Botswana
- Key people: Juku B. Ratsatsi, administrative secretary
- Affiliations: BFTU

The Botswana Beverages & Allied Workers' Union (BB&AWU) is a trade union affiliate of the Botswana Federation of Trade Unions in Botswana.
