= Botswana Private Medical & Health Services Workers' Union =

Trade union in Botswana

BPM&HSWU
- Botswana Private Medical & Health Services Workers' Union
- Headquarters: Gaborone, Botswana
- Location: Botswana
- Key people: Leaname Keagakwa, general secretary
- Affiliations: BFTU

The Botswana Private Medical & Health Services Workers' Union (BPM&HSWU) is a trade union affiliate of the Botswana Federation of Trade Unions in Botswana.
