= Botswana Railways Amalgamated Workers' Union =

Trade union in Botswana

BRAWU
- Botswana Railways Amalgamated Workers' Union
- Headquarters: Gaborone, Botswana
- Location: Botswana
- Key people: Cristopher Phikane, general secretary
- Affiliations: BFTU

The Botswana Railways Amalgamated Workers' Union (BRAWU) is a trade union representing employees at Botswana Railways. It is an affiliate of the Botswana Federation of Trade Unions in Botswana.
