= Botswana Meat Industry Workers' Union =

Trade union in Botswana

BMIWU
- Botswana Meat Industry Workers' Union
- Headquarters: Lobatse, Botswana
- Location: Botswana
- Members: 1000~
- Key people: Peter Rakanyane, Chairman
- Affiliations: BFTU

The Botswana Meat Industry Workers' Union (BMIWU) is a trade union affiliate of the Botswana Federation of Trade Unions in Botswana.
