= University of Botswana Non-Academic Staff Union =

Trade union in Botswana

- University of Botswana Non-Academic Staff Union
- Founded: 12 April 1989; 27 January 1992 (registered)
- Headquarters: Gaborone, Botswana
- Location: Botswana
- Key people: Gadzani Mhotsha, general secretary
- Affiliations: BFTU

The University of Botswana Staff Union, formerly the University of Botswana Non-Academic Staff Union (UBNASU) is a trade union affiliate of the Botswana Federation of Trade Unions (BFTU).

Gadzani Mhotsha, General Secretary of the UBNASU, also served as general secretary of the BFTU.

== Strikes ==
In November 2006, UBNASU took strike action against university management in a dispute over access to parking. In September 2010, UBNASU along with the University of Botswana Academic and Senior Support Staff Union (UBASSSU), opposed salary adjustments at the university which would have seen the vice-chancellor's salary increase 100 percent. Both unions called off strike actions when the salary increase was scrapped.
