= Botswana Telecommunications Corporation =

Telecommunication and ISP company in Botswana

- Type: Public company
- Industry: Telecommunications
- Founded: 1980
- Headquarters: Megaleng, 50350, Khama Crescent, Mmaraka Extension 1, Gaborone, Botswana
- Key people: Thato Kewakae; Board Chairperson; Jürgen Peschel; Chief Executive Officer
- Products: Fixed (voice & data), mobile (voice & data), broadband services, cloud and fintech solutions
- Revenue: P1.49 billion (2025)
- Number of employees: 784 (October 2025)
- Website: www.btc.bw

Botswana Telecommunications Corporation (BTC) is a converged telecommunications operator offering fixed (voice & data), mobile (voice & data), broadband services, cloud and fintech solutions. It was established in 1980 as a 100% Government owned entity.

It is the first state owned enterprise to be privatised in 2016 and is the only public-listed telecommunications company on the Botswana Stock Exchange with shareholding of (54.16%) by Botswana Government and 45.84% issued shares held by the public.

Retail shareholders account for 99.06% of the number of shareholders at 39,888, a testament to BTC`s citizen economic empowerment agenda.

== History ==
BTC was established in 1980 to provide, develop, operate and manage Botswana's national and international telecommunications services. BTC was a parastatal in which the Botswana government held 100% equity. BTC was the only telecommunications provider in Botswana until 1996 when an amendment of the BTC Act removed the monopoly of BTC and allowed indirect competition from two cellular companies, Mascom and Orange Botswana.

BTC's network is composed of an all-digital microwave and fibre optic system with digital exchanges at the main centres. The current network comprises 7,300 kilometres of microwave radio and fibre optic links between 12 main processors, each serving a specific area of the country. The switching units have a capacity of about 117,000 lines. Current services provided include national and international telephony, managed and data networks, very small aperture terminal (VSAT), private wires, leased circuits, toll free services, Internet, paging, public telephones, voice messaging, telex, packet switching, telegraph and customer premises.

BTC works closely with the two major mobile operators in Botswana namely Mascom and Orange Botswana. In 2008 BTC established a mobile arm, beMOBILE. On 1 November 2012 BTC was converted to and registered as a public company, Botswana Telecommunications Corporation Limited (BTCL). It is the first state owned enterprise to be privatised and is the only public-listed telecommunications company on the Botswana Stock Exchange since 2016. Government of Botswana currently owns (54.16%) of the issued shares capital, with 51% being held through a Special Purpose Entity known as Botswana Privatisation Asset Holdings and the remainder through its relevant ministry. The remaining 45.84% is held by local companies, private individuals and trusts.

BTCL also provides virtual telephony services, paging and data communication for corporate networks.

== Corporate Governance ==
Current members of the board of directors of BTCL are:

- Thato Kewakae – Board Chairperson
- Jürgen Peschel – Chief Executive Officer
- Mcedisi Roger Solomon – Member
- Amantle Kgosiemang – Member
- ltemogeng Basadi Pheto – Member
- Kgotso Bannalotlhe – Member
- Lorato Mosetlhanyane - Member
- Andries Delport - Member
- Mythri Sambasivan-George - Member
- Hildah Mocuminyane-Hlanti - Member
- Ikanyeng Molemele - Member

== BTC Executive Management ==
- Jürgen Peschel – Chief Executive Officer
- Boitumelo Paya – Chief Financial Officer
- Mike Siachitema – Chief Marketing Officer
- Luka Disho – Chief Human Capital Officer
- Sefalana Mophuting - Chief Enterprise Sales Officer
- Sipho Ntebang - Chief Consumer Sales Officer
- Abel McErick - Chief Digital Officer
- Michelle Molefi – Corporate Office (A)

== Financial ==
As BTC continues the transformational journey toward becoming a fully digital business, we delivered a strong set of results for the financial year ended 31 March 2025. Revenue from contracts with customers increased by P57 million reaching P1.493 billion a growth of 4% compared to the prior year. This positive trajectory was supported by prudent cost management, with the cost of goods sold declining by P34 million (5%), from P637 million to P603 million. As a result, gross profit rose by P91 million year-on-year, reflecting an 11% improvement in the Company’s overall gross profit margin. This momentum continued at the earnings before interest and taxation (EBIT) level, driven in part by increased other income from the sale of decommissioned copper assets. However, this was partially offset by an increase in operating expenses, which brought total operating costs to P714 million, an increase of P67 million from the previous year. Despite this, the Company reported a year-on-year improvement of P62 million in EBIT, closing the year at P214 million up from P152 million in the prior year.

Net interest income for the year stood at P45 million, slightly lower than the P48 million recorded in the previous year. The P2.6 million decline was primarily due to lower interest rates offered by banks and reduced cash available for investment, following the payment of a special dividend for the financial year ending March 2024. With an effective tax rate of 22% maintained across both years, the Company recorded an income tax expense of P56.8 million, up from P42.4 million in the prior year. As a result, BTC closed the financial year with a profit after tax of P202.2 million, marking an increase of P44.7 million compared to the 2024 financial year.

== Timelines ==
BTC's Milestones
Year	Activity
1999	BTC Group records an all-time high profit of Pula 75.0 million. BTC Group enters into interconnect and backhaul network agreement with mobile operators. Customer connections increased to 144 195 lines.
2000	BTC Group loses market share. The new billing system creates doubts. BTC's image slide. Mobile operators skyrocket with their connections.
2001	Despite resolution of billing system problems, net profit declines to Pula 2.2 million. Wireless technology introduced in the local loop. BTC Group realises that it has lost significant market share to mobile operators. Introduces pre-paid technology.
2002	IDI of Ireland is invited to steady BTC Group. Restructuring commences with 600 staff retrenched, staff numbers dropping to less than 1,000. Government engages BTC Group for its Rural Development Programme (Nteletsa Project). BTC Group records an all-time high loss of Pula 39 million.
2003	VSAT technology introduced. Measures to improve technology and quality introduced.
2004	Profitability returns. Total restructuring cost Pula 162.0 million. International connectivity established through SAT 3 through South Africa. BTC Group endorses Government of Botswana's ICT plan – Maitlamo initiatives.
2005	BTC adopts Intelligent Network Platforms strategy and refocuses its strategy based on broadband data. Broadband is rolled out with ADSL in Gaborone. Profitability returns to 139.0 million.
2006	Telecommunication liberalisation announcement by the minister responsible for Science, Communication and Technology.
2007	BTC Group awarded a Public Telecommunications Operator licence.
2008	BTC Group launches its mobile service under the brand name "be Mobile"
2009	Aggressive rollout of the beMOBILE Network. Successful launch of converged product offering and expansion of broadband to entire Botswana
2016	BTC lists on the Botswana Stock Exchange
2017	BTC changes BeMobile to BTC MOBILE and adds the LTE network with a wide network coverage across Botswana
2018	BTC's Broadband Internet takes a giant leap from 20 Mbps to 50 Mbps this is made possible through various technologies within the BTC network.
2018	BTC launches a new converged billing platform to improve efficiency and service delivery.
2019	BTC commissions the Sentlhaga Data Centre and launches improved VSAT capabilities.
2021	BTC hosts Digital Shift BW themed “Transforming Botswana for success in the digital age”.
2021	BTC launches the first-ever Telecommunications Museum in Botswana
2023	BTC hosts the second edition of the BTC Francistown Marathon
2023	BTC launches 4G network expansion in the North-West District and Okavango District, covering 45 villages.
2025	BTC officially opens the BTC Innovation to serve as a hub for transformation, providing space for developing and testing new technologies and solutions.

== Commitments ==
Botswana Telecommunication Corporation has three suppliers for Internet bandwidth:

1. Botswana Fibre Networks
2. Liquid Technologies Botswana
3. Paratus Botswana

== BTC to be privatized ==
In June 2010, the government of Botswana government planned to privatize BTC. The Sunday Standard reported that Presidential Affairs Minister, Lesego Motsumi told parliament that the cabinet has taken a decision regarding the privatization structure of BTC and the information will be communicated with all stakeholders soon. Lesego Motsumi stated that the aim of the privatization was to minimize risks, and get maximum benefits. She added that the government had to carry out extensive consultations before going ahead with the plans.

== BTCL listing ==
BTCL listed on the Botswana Stock Exchange on 8 April 2016 at P1 per share and total valuation of P1.05 billion (1.05 billion shares). The listing was muchly awaited and was oversubscribed but individual citizen were given preference over company. The shares were allocated 51% to the government of Botswana, 5% to employees of BTCL and 44% to Batswana and Botswana companies. The shares were largely restricted for the benefit of Batswana and are traded among Batswana and companies benefiting for Batswana e.g. funds managers.

The share price spiked on listing and continued its to rise to high of P1.30 per share then subsequently declined upon announcements of financial year results of a P371 million loss. The share is currently trading at P0.85 per share as of 15 September 2016.

It was announced that Paul Taylor, who had led BTCL to its transformation and subsequent listing would not have his contract renewed at end of his contract which ended in July 2016. Anthony Masunga was then appointed acting managing director. On 1 November 2012, Botswana Telecommunications Corporation (BTC) was converted from a statutory body into a public company limited by shares, in accordance with the Transition Act and Companies Act, and renamed Botswana Telecommunications Corporation Limited.

== See also ==
- Botswana Telecommunication Employees' Union
