= Botswana Central Bank Staff Union =

Trade union in Botswana

BCBSU
- Botswana Central Bank Staff Union
- Headquarters: Gaborone, Botswana
- Location: Botswana
- Key people: Esan Motlaleng, general secretary
- Affiliations: BFTU

The Botswana Central Bank Staff Union (BCBSU) is a trade union affiliate of the Botswana Federation of Trade Unions in representing workers at the Bank of Botswana.
