= Botswana Unified Revenue Service =

Agency of the Botswana government

Government parastatal overview
- Jurisdiction: Botswana
- Headquarters: Gaborone, Botswana
- Government parastatal executive: Jeanette Chanda Makgolo, Commissioner General
- Parent department: Ministry of Finance
- Website: www.burs.org.bw

Botswana Unified Revenue Service (BURS) is the revenue service agency of the Botswana government. It is responsible for collecting taxes and administering the Botswana Unified Revenue Service Act. The mandate of BURS includes providing tax assistance to taxpayers and pursuing and resolving instances of erroneous or fraudulent tax filings.

== Revenue collection ==
Botswana Unified Revenue Service is responsible for assessing, collecting and accounting for revenue through the Ministry of Finance as specified by the Botswana Unified Revenue Service Act. The revenues and taxes administered by BURS include:

- Income Tax
- Pay As You Earn (PAYE)
- Value Added Tax
- Withholding taxes
- Excise duty
- Special excise duty
- Capital gains tax
- Carbon tax
- Road tolls
- Surtax
- Stamp duty
- Customs duty
- Presumptive taxes

== See also ==
- Companies and Intellectual Property Authority
- Zimbabwe Revenue Authority
