= Khoutsiri =

Town in Botswana

Khoutsiri is a settlement in the Kalahari Desert of in Botswana immediately northeast of the D'Kar Kuru Bushman Museum off an unimproved section of the A3 highway.
