= Khurutshe =

- Location in Botswana
- Coordinates: 23°44′4″S 26°10′54″E
- Country: Botswana
- District: Kgatleng District

Population (2001)
  - Total: 35

Khurutshe is a village in Kgatleng District of Botswana. The village is located 100 km north of Mochudi, and it has a primary school. The population was 35 in 2001 census.
