= Kgagodi crater =

Meteorite crater in Botswana

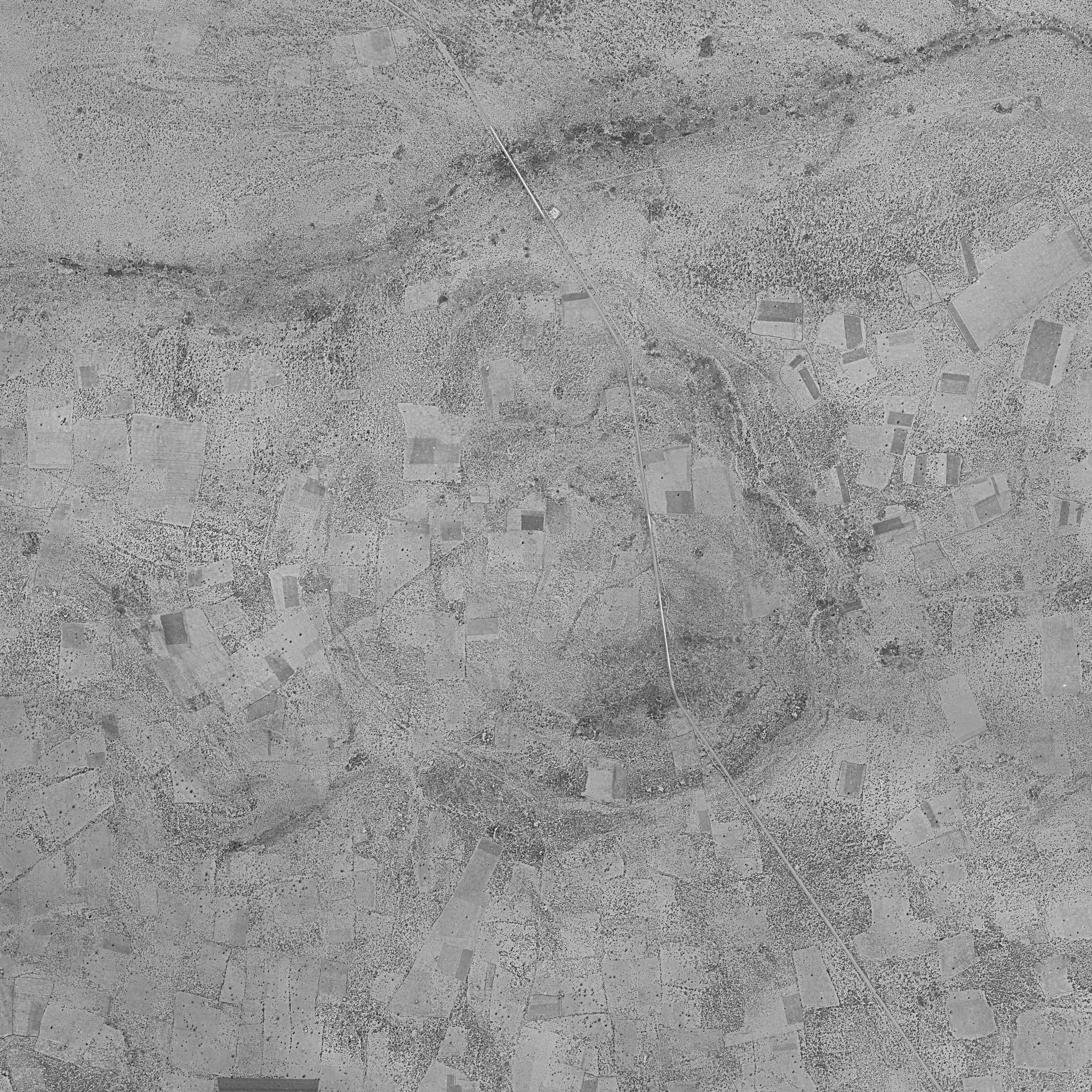
- Kgagodi crater in 1984

- Location within Botswana
- Location: Kalahari Basin, Central, Botswana; 22°29′S 27°35′E

Impact crater structure
- Confidence: Confirmed
- Diameter: 3.5 km (2.2 mi)
- Age: <180 Ma; ~Cretaceous
- Exposed: Yes
- Drilled: Yes

Kgagodi is an exposed meteorite impact crater in Botswana. It is located south of the village of Kgagodi in Central Botswana. It is considered the first impact structure to be recognized in the Kalahari Desert region of southern Africa, with an estimated age ranging from the late Cretaceous to early Tertiary period. It is a simple, bowl-shaped structure with a diameter of 3.5 km (2.2 mi), buried beneath sediments, and lacking a prominent surface expression.

== Discovery and location ==
Kgagodi meteorite impact crater is located south of the village of Kgagodi in Central Botswana. The crater first came to attention in 1997, when a water-drilling expedition came across an elliptical-shaped structure filled with sediment. The Geological Survey of Botswana then drilled a core sample from 274 m (899 ft) deep, which suggested it may be an impact structure. Impact breccia were soon discovered, confirming Kgagodi as an impact crater. It is considered the first impact structure to be recognized in the Kalahari Desert region of southern Africa.

== Structure and formation ==
The crater is about 3.5 km (2.2 mi) in diameter. It is estimated to have been formed in the late Cretaceous to early Tertiary Period. It is a simple, bowl-shaped structure buried beneath sediments, and lacking a prominent surface expression. Its formation involved extreme pressures generating shockwaves that penetrated the target material, a rapid process typically completed within minutes. Analysis of aeromagnetic data revealed a smooth magnetic signature over the basin, indicating younger sediment fill, and identified two cross-cutting lineaments. The basin's geology suggests it could be an intersection of two fault lines, with the shallow basin fill consisting of low resistive materials that may correspond to saturated sediments, implying good groundwater potential.

== See also ==
- List of impact craters in Africa
