= Amagents F.C. =

- Full name: Amagents Football Club
- Short name: Amagents F.C.
- Ground: Lekhubu Secondary School
- Coach: Jonathan Laverick

Amagents Football Club is a football club based in the Broadhurst district of Gaborone, Botswana. For the 2010/11 Season they will be playing in the GACFA Second Division.

== Organisation ==
The club consists of the first team and two youth teams, who play at the Under 17 and Under 15 levels. The first team is coached by Jonathan Laverick, who was appointed in May 2009, the youth teams are managed by William Monene.

== Colours ==
Amagents play in Black Shirts/Shorts with Orange trimming. The youth teams play in an all white kit. There are currently no shirt sponsors. The youth teams play in Blue, with the kit being donated by Billingham Campus School in the UK.

== Recent history ==
Amagents had an eventful 2008/9 season moving to Lekhubu Private School after their home ground was demolished for development. Although they led the league at Christmas, the team ended up missing out on promotion after a poor second half of the season. This led to the appointment of a new coach. This led to a strong start to the 2009/10 season, but only a sixth-place finish.
The U17 team gained third place in an international 7-a-Side competition held at Maru a Pula School in September 2009. Following this success a campaign was launched to organise boots and equipment for the youth team. This campaign was featured in the Northern Echo.
The club has also featured in raising HIV/AIDS awareness.
2009 saw the launch of the club's website, one of the first for any club team in Botswana. This in turn led to worldwide publicity following an AFP film crew visit and the setting of a YouTube channel carrying match highlights, another first in Botswana.
