= Botswana Girl Guides Association =

National Guiding organisation of Botswana

- Botswana Girl Guides Association
- Country: Botswana
- Founded: 1924
- Membership: 2,432
- Affiliation: World Association of Girl Guides and Girl Scouts

The Botswana Girl Guides Association is the national Guiding organisation of Botswana. It serves 10,310 members (as of 2014). Founded in 1924, the girls-only organisation became a full member of the World Association of Girl Guides and Girl Scouts in 1969.

== Program ==
The purpose of the association is "to develop the girls' potential in order to make a responsible citizen in any community". The association runs a two-year course on home economics for school dropouts on a national basis, mainly for girls. The participants get a certificate at the end of the second year in either sewing or catering. This project was started in 1981, and some of the graduates are working in local hotels.

== See also ==
- The Botswana Scouts Association
