= Modise Mokwadi Fly =

Modise Mokwadi Fly

Modise Mokwadi Fly was a Motswana politician, reggae artist and activist who was executed in 2010 for murdering his two-year-old son in 2006.

Fly was the general secretary of the Botswana Congress Party Youth League. On 27 November 2006, Fly killed his son Tawana Mosinyi with an axe while the boy was sleeping. He claimed that he had killed the boy accidentally, while throwing an axe at police outside his window. Fly contended that the police had shot at him.

Fly was convicted of murder by the High Court in Francistown on 17 October 2008. On 21 October, Justice Thomas Masuku sentenced him to death by hanging and recommended that he appeal to the Court of Appeal of Botswana. After his conviction, Fly admitted his guilt and apologized to his family.

Fly's appeal was dismissed and he was subsequently executed at Gaborone Central Prison on 24 March 2010.
