= Samuel O. Outlule =

Botswana diplomat (1957–2022)

Samuel Otsile Outlule (born 8 July 1957) was the Permanent Representative (Ambassador) of Botswana to the United Nations from 2005 to 2010. He presented his credentials to the Secretary-General of the United Nations on 18 October 2005, replacing Alfred M. Dube.

He formerly held positions at Botswana's Ministry of Foreign Affairs, becoming deputy director for Africa and the Middle East in 1997 and Director of International Relations in 1999. In November 2000, he became Clerk to the Cabinet and President Festus Mogae's Senior Private Secretary.

Outlule served as PS at the Ministry of Youth, Sport and Culture for a few months in 2010, and was appointed as the new Ambassador of Botswana to the European Union in November 2010, replacing T. Modise.

He died in 2022.
