= Botswana Bank Employees' Union =

Trade union in Botswana

BOBEU
- Botswana Bank Employees' Union
- Headquarters: Gaborone, Botswana
- Location: Botswana
- Key people: Edith Molefhi, general secretary
- Affiliations: BFTU

The Botswana Bank Employee's Union (BOBEU) is a trade union affiliate of the Botswana Federation of Trade Unions in Botswana.
