= Companies and Intellectual Property Authority =

CIPA
Government parastatal overview
- Formed: 25 March 2011
- Jurisdiction: Botswana
- Headquarters: Gaborone, Botswana
- Government parastatal executive: Paul Conductor Masena, Chief Executive Officer
- Parent department: Ministry of Trade and Industry
- Website: www.cipa.co.bw

Companies and Intellectual Property Authority (CIPA) is Botswana's registrar of companies and is a government parastatal. It falls under the Ministry of Trade and Industry. All types of companies (as permitted by the Botswana Companies and Intellectual Property Authority Act) are incorporated and registered with CIPA, which requires them to file specific details in accordance with the Companies and Intellectual Property Authority Act. All registered limited companies, including subsidiary, small and inactive companies, must file annual financial statements alongside their annual company returns. The registration of companies has been done online since the introduction of the online business registration system launched by Bogolo Kenewendo.

== Types of companies ==
The many different types of companies that are required to register with CIPA include:

- Private Company
- Public Company
- Close Company
- Company Limited by Guarantee

== See also ==
- Air Botswana
- Bogolo Kenewendo
- The Voice Botswana
- Botswana Unified Revenue Service
