= Shirley Itumeleng Tiny Segokgo =

Shirley Itumeleng Tiny Segokgo is a politician from Botswana. She is a member of the National Assembly of Botswana and also a member of the women's caucus. Segokgo is also a member of the Pan-African Parliament.

== See also ==
- List of members of the Pan-African Parliament
