= Andrew Sesinyi =

Andrew Sesinyi (born September 7, 1952) is the Motswana author of Love on the Rocks (1981). He also worked in the media administration of Botswana. Sesinyi is Botswana's first English novelist.

His works convey the images of urban Botswana in the 1980s. Sesinyi has been profiled by Mmegi, Botswana's only independent newspaper published daily. Mmegi published its interview under a special Icons of Botswana feature.

== Sources ==
- Denbow, James Raymond (2006). Culture and Customs of Botswana. Westport, Connecticut: Greenwood Publishing Group. ISBN 978-0-313-33178-7.
- Lederer, Mary (2014). Novels of Botswana in English, 1930-2006. African Heritage Press. ISBN 978-1-940729-15-2.
