= Thatayaone Mothuba =

Motswana footballer

Personal information
- Full name: Thatayaone Mothuba
- Date of birth: 5 May 1978 (age 48)
- Place of birth: Gaborone, Botswana
- Height: 1.75 m (5 ft 9 in)
- Position: Defender

Senior career*
Years	Team	Apps	(Gls)
2000–2003	Notwane		
2003–	Nico United		

International career
2001–2002	Botswana	2	(0)
- * Club domestic league appearances and goals

Thatayaone Mothuba (born 5 May 1978) is a Motswana former footballer. Mothuba was first called up to the Botswana national football team in 2001, and won two caps for his country in 2002.

== Career ==
Thatayone Mothuba was born on 5 May 1978. He played for Botswana under 17,20,23, senior national team and was part of the team that won the Botswana 4 nation tournament when he scored the winning goal against Namibia. A very strong defender with aerial power. He won championships with the former team Notwane football club. He was part of the team that played a goalless draw in a COSAFA castle cup in Gaborone national stadium. Currently he is an assistant coach at Nico United in Selebi Phikwe, he worked with the likes of former Zimbabwean winger Madinda Ndlovu, Luke Masumera, Paul Gundani.
