= Ukwi =

Village in the Kgalagadi District

Coordinates: 23°33′S 20°30′E

Location of Ukwi

Ukhwi is a village in the Kalahari Desert of Kgalagadi District, western Botswana, 30 kilometers (19 mi) from the border with Namibia. The population was 669 in the 2022 census. Although English is the official language of Botswana, numerous other languages are spoken in the area: Afrikaans, Tswana, Nama, and Taa.
