= The Botswana Scouts Association =

National Scouting organization of Botswana

Botswana Scouts Association
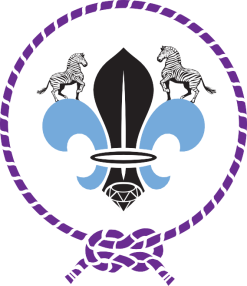
- Headquarters: Aedume Scout Park
- Location: Gaborone
- Country: Botswana
- Founded: 1936
- Membership: 10 000
- Chief Scout: Kefilwe Boikhutso
- Chief Commissioner: Rebecca Lebati Pule
- Affiliation: World Organization of the Scout Movement
- Website www.scouts.co.bw

The Botswana Scouts Association, the national Scouting organization of Botswana, was founded in 1936, and became a member of the World Organization of the Scout Movement in 1958. The boys only Botswana Scouts Association claims a membership of more than 10,000 Scouts; however, WOSM lists only 2,075 members as of 2011.

The scout movement was initiated in 1907 and started in the then Bechuanaland in 1936 at Mafikeng where it was moved to Lobatse in 1964 just before Botswana gained independence.

The first president of Botswana, Sir Seretse Khama was the first patron of the Botswana Scout Association with current President Advocate Duma Boko being the current patron. Other dignitaries who served as Patrons are;

- Sir Ketumile Masire from 13 July 1980 – 31 March 1998
- Dr Festus Mogae from 1 April 1998 – 1 April 2008
- Lt Gen. Dr Seretse Khama Ian Khama from 1 April 2008 – 1 April 2018.
- Dr Mokgweetsi Eric Keabetswe Masisi from 1 April 2018 – 1 November 2024

With the current President Advocate Duma Boko being the current patron.

The movement was initiated at the school to instill discipline and build friendship among boys and girls without discrimination and is used as a team building tool aimed at teaching children to take responsibility of their school work, teach them the importance of doing chores at home and school and work with movements from other countries.

== Activities ==
Scouts in Botswana grow up learning the outdoor skills from their parents and family. They use skills such as fire building and cooking, finding the direction of travel by use of the sun and stars, knots, pioneering, first aid and more, in everyday life.

Scout groups meet in local schools or in the outdoors in villages. Scouts have been involved in the self-help projects and other rural activities. Some of these long-term projects are poultry farming, beekeeping, wood and metalworking, and fruit and vegetable production.

Scouts often take long, adventurous trips into the bush. Their trips require much care, as there are numerous dangerous animals such as elephants and lions.

Adult male leadership is difficult in Botswana, as adult males do not associate themselves with children until they reach the age of 14. As a result of this, most leaders are women, teachers and clergymen.

Many Scout troops have their own vegetable gardens and are taught how to care for cattle, sheep and goats.

== Program sections ==
- Cub Scouts
- Boy Scouts
- Rovers

The Scout Motto is Nna o i Paakantse, Be Prepared in Tswana.

== Emblem ==
The old membership badge of the Botswana Scouts Association features a lion's head, a symbol in use since Botswana was a colonial branch of British Scouting. The membership badge was commonly known as the Lion Badge among scouts, which they believed served as a sign of Bravery as one attained one after an investiture ceremony for showing how tough they are.

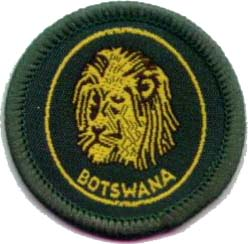
Lion Badge

A new membership badge features a new modern logo of the Botswana Scouts Association which surfaced in the early months of 2017. The Emblem is similar to the world scout emblem but stands out as it characterized by two zebras on to of a fleur-de-lis and a circular ribbon joined together by a reef knot.

== See also ==
- Botswana Girl Guides Association
