= List of Tswana people =

The Tswana people are a Bantu ethnic group native to southern Africa.

== Academia, business and politics ==
- Frances Baard, South African trade unionist
- Manne Dipico, South African politician
- Unity Dow
- Professor Ntate Daniel Kgwadi
- Ian Khama
- Khama III
- Sir Seretse Khama
- Keorapetse Kgositsile
- Moses Kotane
- Mpule Kwelagobe
- David Magang
- Supra Mahumapelo
- Mmusi Maimane
- Lucas Mangope
- Sir Ketumile Masire
- Mokgweetsi Masisi
- Joe Matthews
- Z. K. Matthews
- Thandi Modise
- Festus Mogae
- Mogoeng Mogoeng
- Job Mokgoro
- Yvonne Mokgoro
- Popo Molefe
- Edna Molewa
- Kgosi Leruo Molotlegi
- Ruth Mompati
- James Moroka
- Dikgang Moseneke
- Nthato Motlana
- Kgalema Motlanthe
- Patrice Motsepe
- Tshepo Motsepe
- Naledi Pandor
- Dipuo Peters
- Mamokgethi Phakeng
- Sol Plaatje
- Abram Onkgopotse Tiro

== Media ==
- Culture Spears
- Charma Gal
- A-Reece
- Khuli Chana
- Presley Chweneyagae
- Fifi Cooper
- Vuyo Dabula
- DJ Fresh
- Katlego Danke
- Connie Ferguson
- Goapele
- HHP
- Kagiso Lediga
- Gail Nkoane Mabalane
- Kabelo Mabalane
- Motlatsi Mafatshe
- Mothusi Magano
- Bonang Matheba
- Tim Modise
- Bontle Modiselle
- Lerato Molapo
- Tumi Molekane
- Faith Nketsi
- Cassper Nyovest
- Manaka Ranaka
- Rapulana Seiphemo
- Tuks Senganga
- Earl Sweatshirt, American rapper of Tswana descent
- Boity Thulo, South African television personality
- Redi Tlhabi, South African journalist
- Emma Wareus, Botswanan model and pageant competitor

== Sports ==
- David Bright, Botswanan football coach
- Itumeleng Khune, South African footballer
- Dikgang Mabalane
- Teko Modise
- Amantle Montsho
- Pitso Mosimane
- Kaizer Motaung
- Kaizer Motaung Junior
- Katlego Mphela
- Mogakolodi Ngele
- Kagiso Rabada
- Jerome Ramatlhakwane
- Dipsy Selolwane
- Jimmy Tau
- Percy Tau, South African footballer
- Baboloki Thebe, Botswanan sprinter
