= Presidents' Day (Botswana) =

Holiday on the third Monday of July

Presidents' Day is a holiday in Botswana. Since 2006, it has been a one-day holiday held on the third Monday and Tuesday in July. Previous to that, it was a two-day holiday, held on Third Monday and Tuesday in July, but the Public Holidays Amendment of 2006 modified the holiday to a single day. Nevertheless, many public and private institutions such as the Botswana Stock Exchange still typically observe a two-day holiday at this time of year.

== See also ==
- Heads of state of Botswana
- George Washington's Birthday, also known as Presidents' Day in the United States
