= Mascom =

Telecommunication company in Botswana

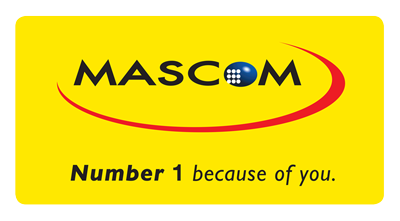

- Company type: Private
- Industry: Telecommunications; Mass media
- Founded: 17 February 1998; 27 years ago
- Founder: Strive Masiyiwa
- Headquarters: Gaborone, Botswana
- Area served: Botswana
- Key people: Dzene Makhwade-Seboni (CEO); Tobokani Rari (chairman); Lilly Sullivan (CIO)
- Products: Mobile phone; Digital television; Digital media; Internet; Telematics
- Owner: Botswana Public Officers Pensions Fund (60%); Econet Wireless (40%)
- Website: mascom.bw

Mascom Wireless Proprietary Limited, is a Botswana mobile telecommunications company. Its head office is in Gaborone. It was established in Gaborone, Botswana on February 17, 1998.

== History ==
The company was first licensed on 17 February 1998. It was founded by Strive Masiyiwa.

Until 2003, Portugal Telecom owned a controlling stake in the company. In 2005, MTN Group purchased a 44% stake in Mascom for $128 million.

In 2016, Dzene Makhwade-Seboni was appointed Chief Operations Officer and became CEO of the company in 2019.

It provides the widest coverage in Botswana, reaching over 95% of the population.

== Services ==
=== Internet ===
Mascom offers users mobile internet via EDGE, 3G, 4G and 4.5G, 4G wingle. Mascom also offer internet service via FTTH (Fiber To The Home). On 25 February 2022, Mascom has been the first mobile telecommunication to introduce 5G on four different places around Gaborone.

=== Gallery of the WTISD 2017 Masunga, North East District ===
Mascom wireless participated at the annual World telecommunications and information society day 2017.

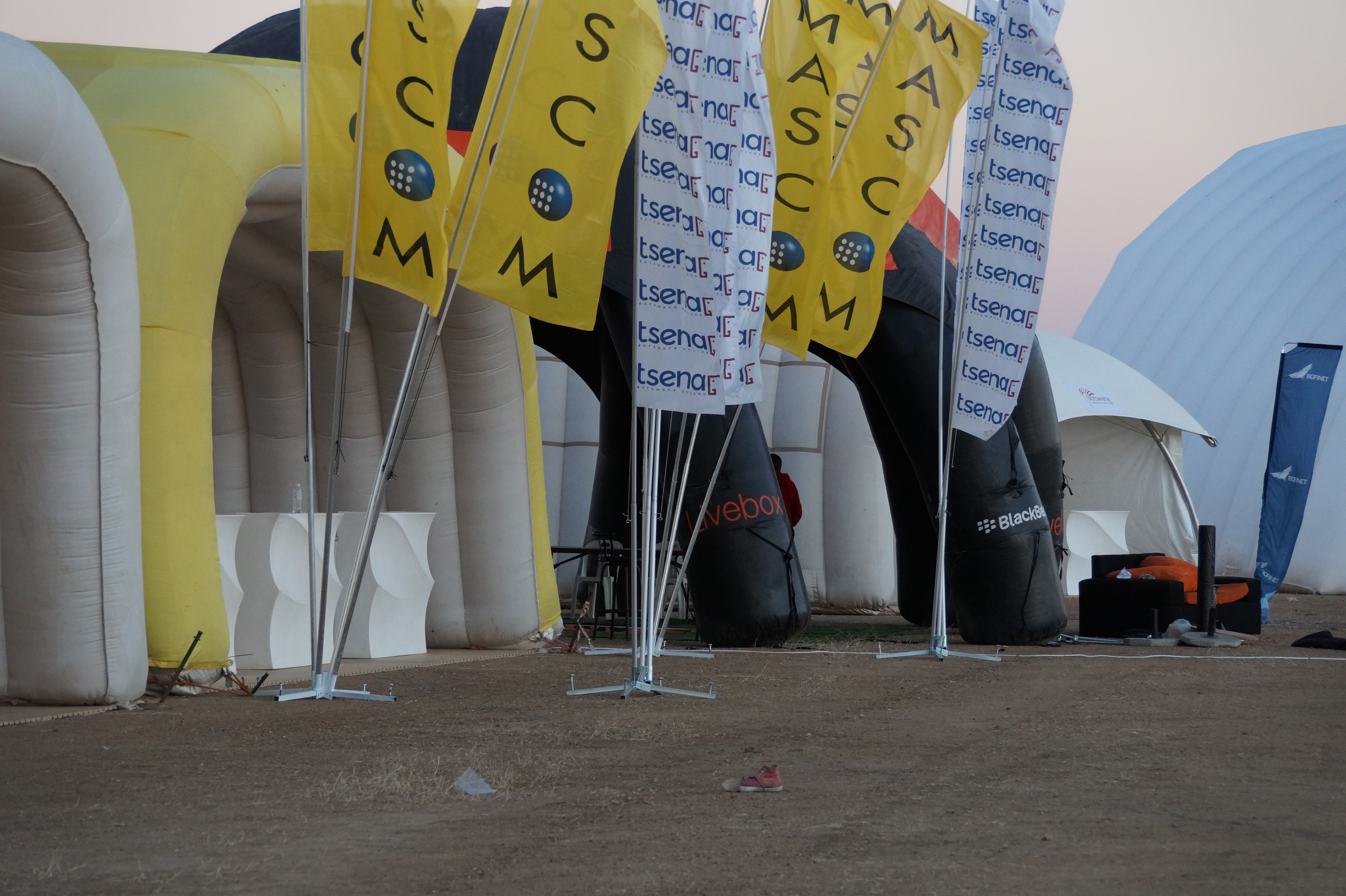
Mascom Wireless Stall at the World telecommunications and information society day 2017 (WTISD 2017)

== See also ==
- Mobile telephony in Africa
- Telephone numbers in Botswana
