= Nxai Pan National Park =

Botswana National park

- IUCN category Ib (wilderness area)
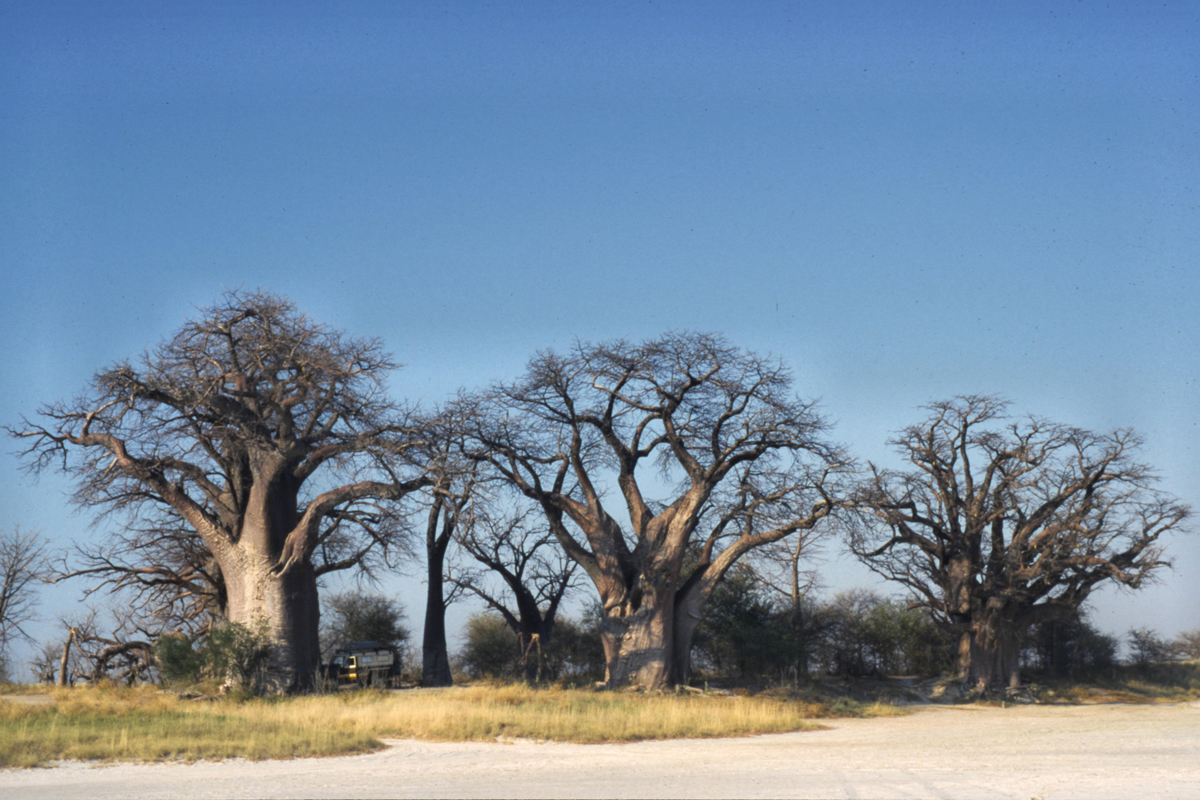
- Baines Baobabs, Nxai Pan National Park, Botswana
- Interactive map of Nxai Pan National Park
- Location: Botswana
- Coordinates: 20°02′30″S 24°46′08″E
- Area: 2,578 km^{2} (995 sq mi)
- Established: 1992

Nxai Pan National Park is a national park in north-eastern Botswana, consisting of Nxai Pan, which is one of the Makgadikgadi Pan salt flats. Nxai Pan National Park lies just north of the Maun-Nata main road and adjoins Makgadikgadi Pans National Park on its northern border. The pan itself is a fossil lake bed of approximately 40 km^{2} in size.

It is home to the cluster of millennia-old baobab trees, which owe their name to Thomas Baines, who first described them for Western botany. Baines’ Baobabs, as they are known today, are a sight sought by many travelers venturing into this untamed terrain of Botswana.

== Wildlife ==
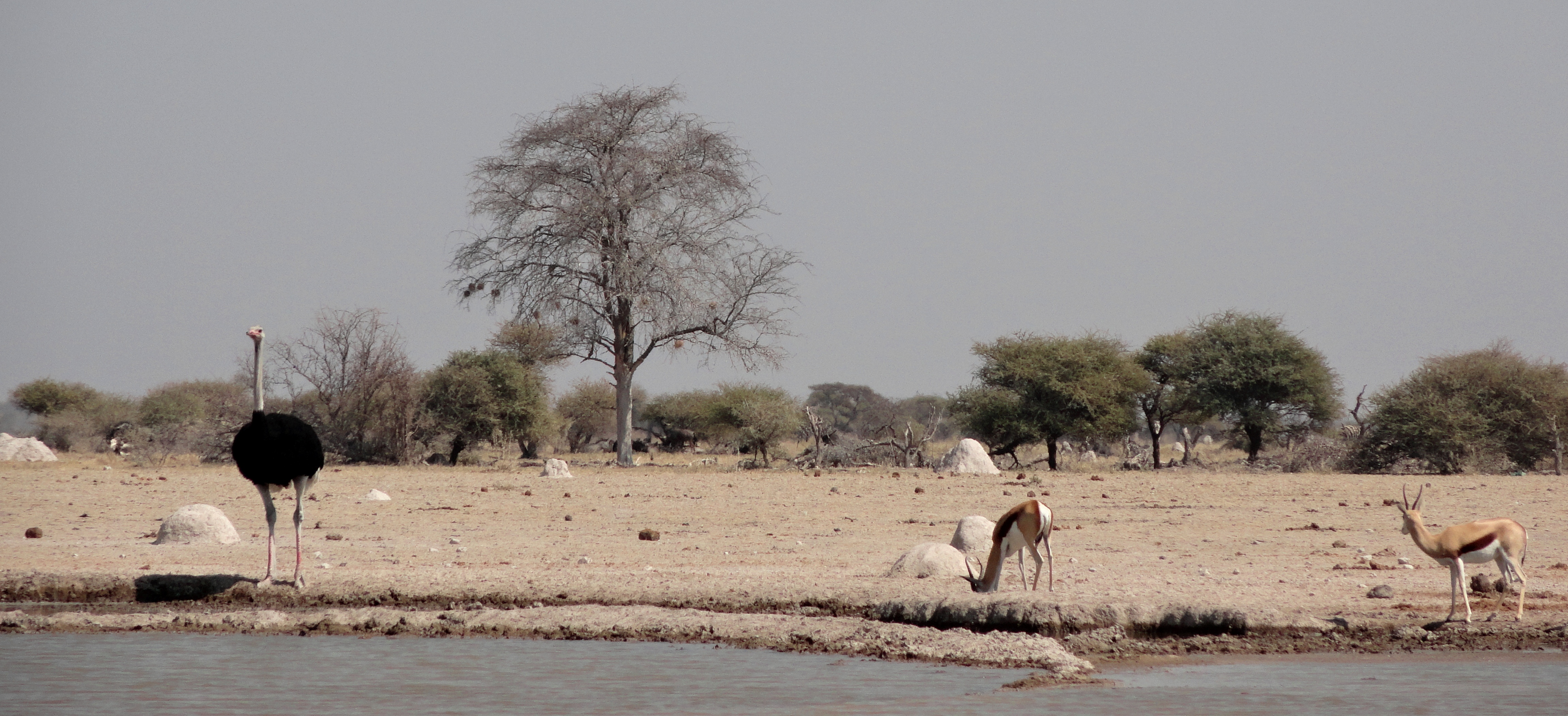
Ostrich and springbok at a waterhole

Nxai National Park is the habitat of elephant, giraffe, zebra, wildebeest, lion, leopard, cheetah, kudu, springbok, impala, ostrich, Cape wild dog, jackal, hyena, bat-eared fox, aardwolf, and honey badger.

== Conservation ==
This park is included in the five-nation Kavango - Zambezi Transfrontier Conservation Area, which is the second-largest nature and landscape conservation area in the world.

== Roads ==
The rainy season which is from November to April is the hot wet summer season and the time when the park is at its best. Game is abundant from December to April but if the rains have been heavy the roads may be difficult to negotiate. Road conditions can become difficult during times of heavy rains. The more accessible time to be in the park is in the dry season, which is from May to September.
