= Mokolodi Nature Reserve =

Private not-for-profit game reserve in southern Botswana

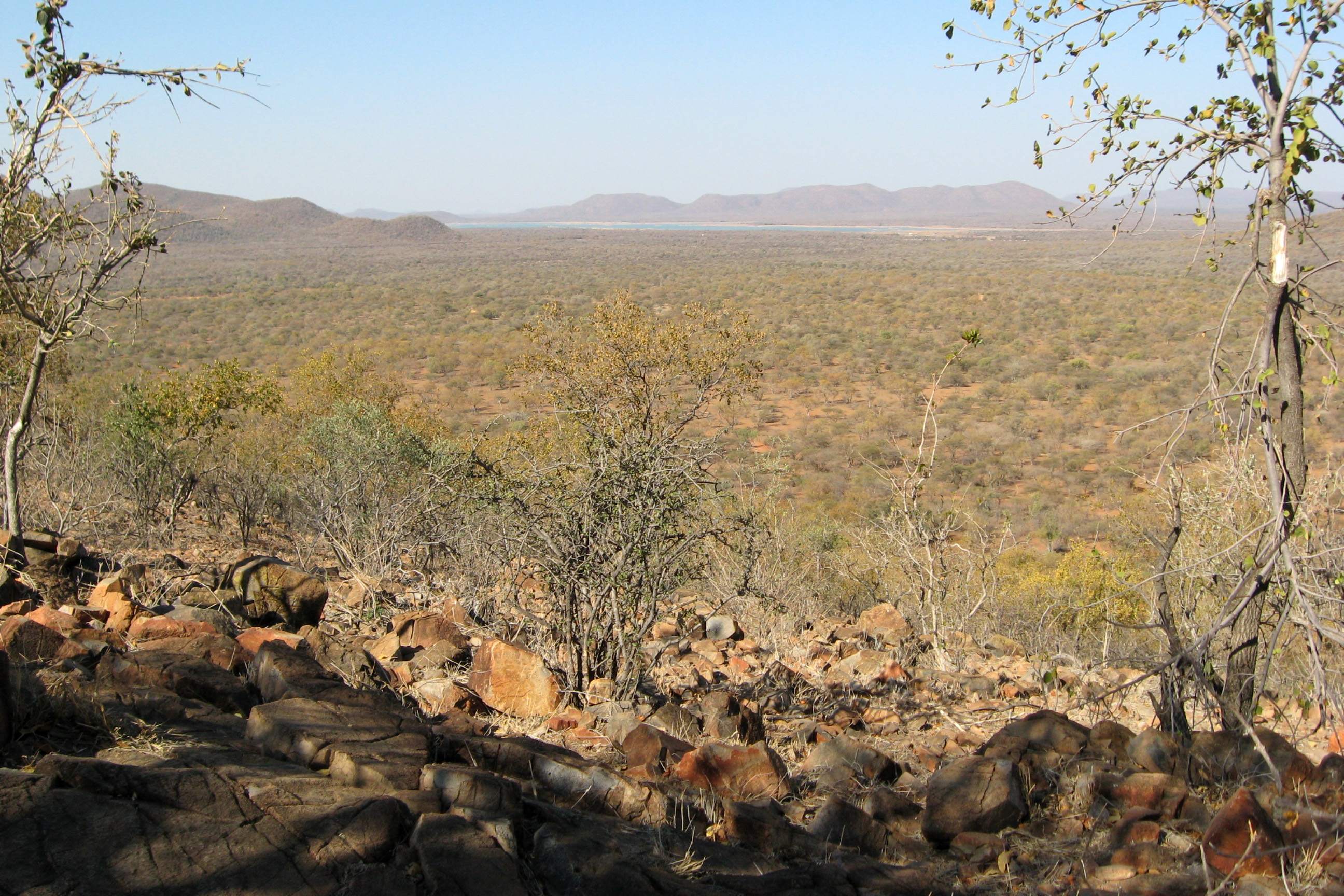
- Mokolodi and surrounding area in the dry season
- Interactive map of Mokolodi Nature Reserve
- Location: Gaborone South
- Coordinates: 24.743294°S 25.798903°E
- Established: 1994 by The Mokolodi Wildlife Foundation

Mokolodi Nature Reserve is a private not-for-profit game reserve in southern Botswana. Founded in 1994 by The Mokolodi Wildlife Foundation, it is situated on 30 square kilometres (12 sq mi) of donated land, 10 kilometres (6.2 mi) south of the capital Gaborone. The nature reserve is inhabited by a wide variety of indigenous African game, bird and reptile species, some of which are rare and vulnerable to the threat of extinction. The southern white rhinoceros herd at Mokolodi Nature Reserve is part of a national breeding programme, which contributes to the rebuilding of the national herd in Botswana.

== Wildlife ==
The reserve contains many species of wildlife such as giraffe, zebra, southern white rhinoceros, mountain reedbuck, red hartebeest, gemsbok, kudu, impala, waterbuck, steenbok, hippopotamus, nile crocodile, brown hyena and leopard. Cheetah and African wild dog are housed in large, separate enclosures within the confines of the reserve. There is also a reptile park containing black mamba, mozambique spitting cobra, puff adder and snouted cobra amongst other species, as well as an aviary with rescued white back and Cape vultures. The reserve is developed as a game sanctuary with an extensive network of paths, which permits viewing the wildlife at close quarters. The park administration is planning to expand its limits of conservation area up to the Lion Park.

== Charity ==
Environmental and conservation education are the key objectives of The Mokolodi Wildlife Foundation. The nature reserve hosts children from across Botswana, some of whom are from disadvantaged backgrounds. The fee-based activity and accommodation services offered to the public by Mokolodi Nature Reserve support the Foundation's charitable objectives, to present the children of Botswana with the opportunity to embrace the natural world and to promote the wider protection of Botswana's natural environment.
