= Khutse Game Reserve =

Game reserve in Botswana

- IUCN category Ib (wilderness area)
- Location within Botswana
- Location: Botswana
- Coordinates: 23.49°S 24.19°E
- Area: 2,500 km^{2} (970 sq mi)
- Established: 1971; 55 years ago
- Governing body: Department of Wildlife and National Parks, Botswana

Khutse Game Reserve is a game reserve in Botswana.

== Overview ==
The name Khutse means "where one kneels to drink" in Sekwena (the local dialect of Setswana). Because of its proximity, and relative accessibility, to the nation's capital, Khutse game Reserve is a common favorite for Gaborone visitors or residents. The 240 km drive takes the traveller through a number of interesting Kalahari villages, including the ‘gateway to the Kalahari,’ Molepolole.

== Geography ==
Adjoining the Central Kalahari Game Reserve to the north, and with no fences separating the two, the terrain of the 2 500 km^{2} reserve combines most types of Kalahari habitat – rolling grasslands, river beds, fossil dunes and grassed and bare pans.

== Flora and fauna ==
Animals commonly sighted include springbok (often in abundance), gemsbok (often common), South African giraffe, wildebeest, hartebeest, kudu, black-backed jackal, steenbok, duiker, and the accompanying predators lion, African leopard, South African cheetah, wildcat, and the endangered brown hyena.
