= Botswana Federation of Trade Unions =

Trade union federation in Botswana

BFTU
- Botswana Federation of Trade Unions
- Founded: 1977
- Headquarters: Gaborone International Finance Park (GIFP) Plot 135,Unit 10, 2nd Floor, Botswana
- Location: Botswana
- Members: 25 Affiliates
- Key people: Martha Molema, president Tshepiso Mbereki, Secretary General
- Affiliations: ITUC, ATUU, SATUCC

The Botswana Federation of Trade Unions (BFTU) is the national trade union federation for Botswana. Founded in 1977, it represents over 90% of all trade unions in the country, including all major unions. The BFTU is currently undertaking a reorganization which will see its 25 affiliates merged and reduced in numbers to 13.

The BFTU is affiliated to the International Trade Union Confederation and the Organization of African Trade Union Unity.
