= List of schools in Botswana =

This is a list of notable schools in Botswana, organized by the country's administrative districts.

== Francistown ==
- Francistown Senior Secondary School
- John Mackenzie School
- Mater Spei College
- Eastern Gate Academy

== Gaborone ==
- Botho University
- Maru a Pula School
- St. Joseph's College, Kgale
- Westwood International School
- Rainbow High School
- Botswana Accountancy College
- University of Botswana
- Limkokwing University of Creative Technology
- University of Agriculture and Natural Resources
- Naledi Senior Secondary School
- Gaborone Senior Secondary School
- Gaborone International School(GIS)
- Al-nur International School
- Livingstone Kolobeng College (LKC)

== Lobatse ==
- Lobatse Senior Secondary School
- Itireleng Community Junior Secondary School
- Ipelegeng Community Junior Secondary School
- Letsopa Community Junior Secondary School
- Crescent School

== North-East District ==
- Masunga Senior Secondary School

== See also ==
- Education in Botswana
