= John Mackenzie School =

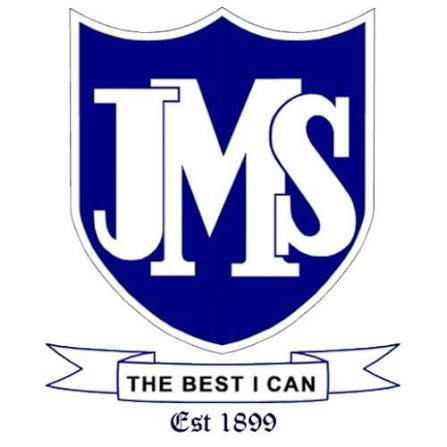

Location
- John Mackenzie School, 623 Lobengula Ave, Francistown; Francistown, North-East District; Botswana; 21°09′54.43″S 27°30′43.13″E

Information
- Former name: the Francistown European School
- School type: Day school and Boarding school
- Motto: The Best I Can
- Established: 16 August 1899
- Founder: Reverend Nelson Fogarty
- Grades: Transition (Standard 0) to A-Levels
- Education system: Independent
- Language: English
- Campus size: Area: 2.53 ha / 25,337.34 m² Perimeter: 734.56 m / 0.73 km
- Campus type: Urban
- Houses: Shashe; Tati; Ntshe
- Colors: Royal Blue & White
- Athletics: Track & Field; Field & Team Sports; Court & Aquatic Sports
- Athletics conference: Independent Secondary Schools Sports Association (ISSSA); Independent Schools Association of Botswana (ISAB); Conference of Heads of Private Primary and Secondary Schools of Botswana (CHOPS); Botswana Integrated Sports Association (BISA)
- Mascot: the Blue Rhino
- Nickname: The Blue Rhinos
- Rival: Clifton College(Francistown, Botswana); Mophato Private School; Maru a Pula School(MAP); Rainbow High School; Westwood International School; Gaborone International School(GIS); Legae Academy; Livingstone Kolobeng College(LKC); Morula Private School; Flamingo International School
- Accreditation: Cambridge International Examinations
- Website: jms.ac.bw

John Mackenzie School is a historic private school situated in Francistown, Botswana.

The school provides education for boys and girls from Transition (Standard 0) through to A-Levels in a multicultural and interdenominational environment. It was the first institution in Francistown to offer English-medium education primary and secondary education. The school is accredited by Cambridge International Examinations (CIE) and serves students from across northern Botswana and beyond. Its curriculum prepares students for further study at higher education institutions in Botswana and internationally.

It is named in honour of Scottish missionary John Mackenzie (1835–99), who spent his working life among, and who argued for the rights of, the Tswana people.

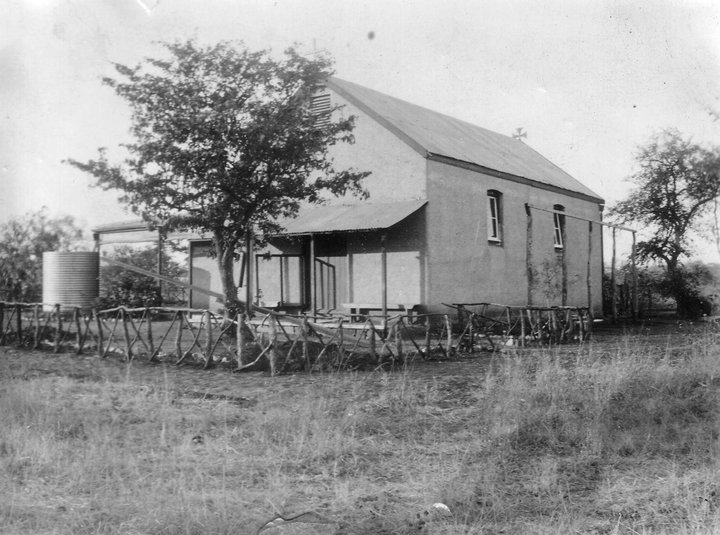
A photograph of the original school premises in the church hall of what is now St. Patrick's Anglican Church, Francistown.

== See also ==
- Education in Botswana
- List of secondary schools in Botswana
