= Nata Senior Secondary School =

Coordinates: 20°12′25″S 26°12′19″E

Location
- Private Bag N007, Nata; Botswana

Information
- Type: Public senior secondary school
- Established: prior to 2012
- School district: Central District
- Grades: Form 4–5

Nata Senior Secondary School is a public senior secondary school in Nata, Central District, Botswana. It was designated as one of four Schools of Excellence by the Ministry of Education and Skills Development in 2013, specialising in pre-vocational disciplines such as music, fashion and design, physical education, and design and technology.

The school has been the subject of media reports concerning infrastructural challenges, including a fire that destroyed boys’ hostels in 2023.

== History ==
Nata Senior Secondary School was in operation by 2012 and was selected alongside Mogoditshane Senior Secondary School, Goodhope Senior Secondary School, and Mmadinare Senior Secondary School to become a School of Excellence with effect from 2013.

In June 2023, the boys hostels were destroyed by fire. Repairs were scheduled for the 2024/25 financial year.

== Academics and performance ==
The school follows the Botswana senior secondary curriculum, with an emphasis on pre-vocational subjects following its designation as a School of Excellence.

According to Daily News, the school has historically recorded limited top-tier national rankings, reaching the national top ten once.
