= Henry Newman (businessman) =

Botswana technology entrepreneur

- Born: Henry Newman; Gaborone, Botswana
- Citizenship: Botswana
- Occupations: Entrepreneur; Businessperson
- Known for: Founding Zesta, Nexus AI, Verbosec.
- Relatives: Randall Newman (brother)
- Website: henrynewman.info

Henry Newman is a Botswana entrepreneur, and the founder and chief technical officer of Verbosec.

== Early life and education ==
Newman was born and raised in the capital city of Gaborone where he also spent his childhood. He did his high school education at St. Joseph's College, Kgale.

== Career ==
He ventured into the entrepreneurship journey by venturing into software development founding Verbosec in 2019 with his brother, Henry Newman.

Newman continued to launch a food delivery company called Zesta (formerly Square Eats) in 2020 during the coronavirus pandemic. In 2024, his company Verbosec launched an AI-powered generative platform called Nexus AI.

== See also ==
- Theo Baloyi
- Elliot Moshoke
- Bogolo Kenewendo
