= Randall Newman =

Botswana technology entrepreneur

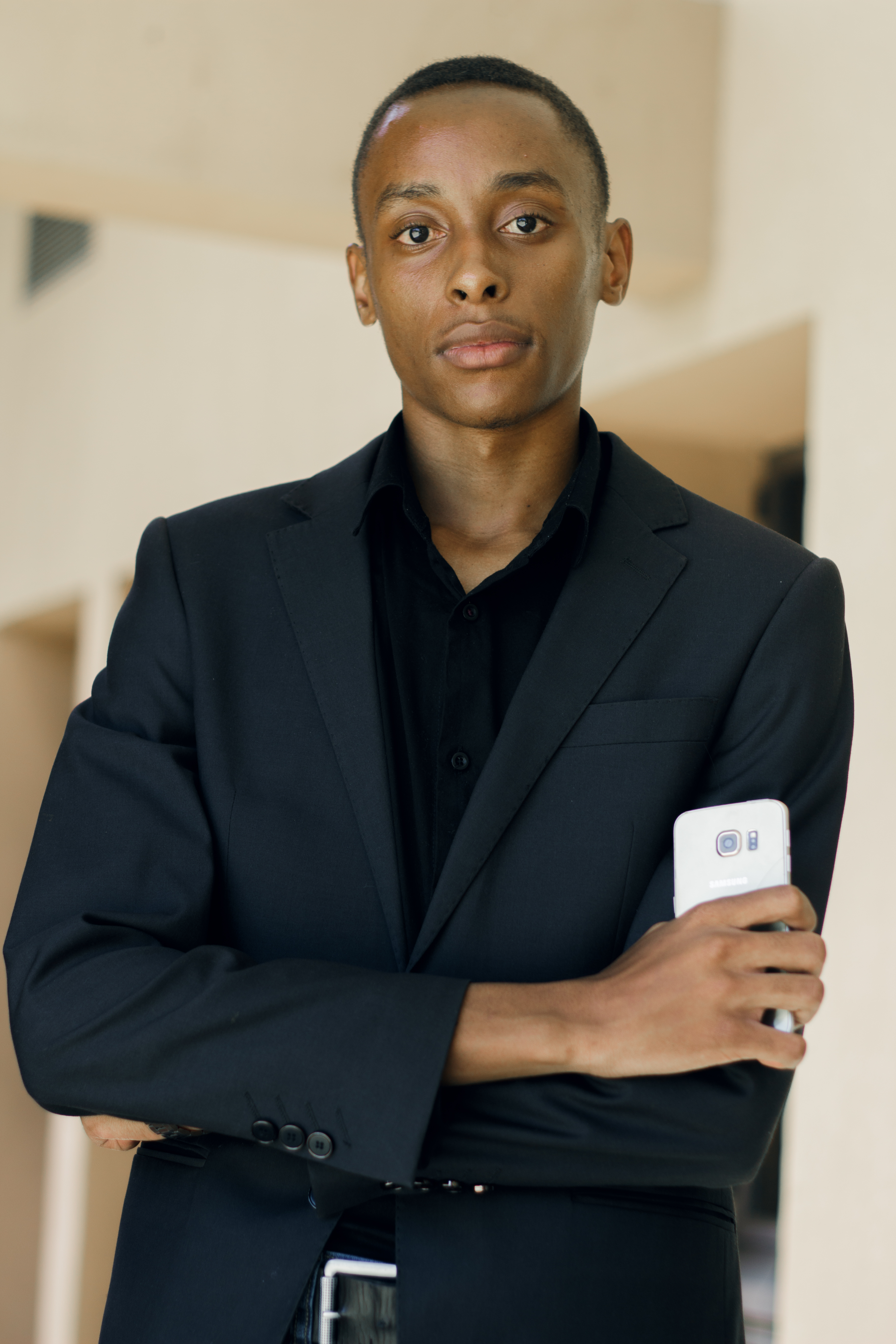
- Born: Randall Newman; Gaborone, Botswana
- Citizenship: Botswana
- Education: Sheffield Hallam University
- Occupations: Entrepreneur; Businessperson
- Known for: Founding Zesta, Nexus AI, Verbosec.
- Relatives: Henry Newman (brother)

Randall Newman is a Botswana entrepreneur, and the founder and chief executive officer of Verbosec.

== Early life and education ==
Newman was born and raised in the capital city of Gaborone where he also spent his childhood. He did his high school education at St. Joseph's College, Kgale.

He holds a Bachelor of Arts with honours degree in Entrepreneurship and Business Leadership from Sheffield Hallam University in partnership with Botswana Accountancy College.

== Career ==
Before leaving the Botswana Accountancy College, Newman joined the technology business landscape by working for a local tech company as an Account Executive. He ventured into the entrepreneurship journey by venturing into software development founding Verbosec in 2019 with his brother, Henry Newman.

Newman continued to launch a food delivery company called Zesta (formerly Square Eats) in 2020 during the coronavirus pandemic. In 2024, his company Verbosec launched an AI-powered generative platform called Nexus AI.

== See also ==
- Theo Baloyi
- Elliot Moshoke
- Bogolo Kenewendo
