= Mmadinare Senior Secondary School =

Location
- Private Bag M4, Mmadinare; Botswana; 21°54′07″S 27°44′19″E

Information
- Type: Public (government) senior secondary school
- Established: 2011
- School district: Central District
- Principal: Pelaelo Makole (as of 2023)
- Grades: Form 4–5

Mmadinare Senior Secondary School is a public senior secondary school in Mmadinare, Central District, Botswana. It opened in 2011 and was designated as one of four Schools of Excellence by the Ministry of Education and Skills Development in 2013, specialising in pre-vocational disciplines such as music, fashion and design, physical education, and design and technology.

== History ==
Mmadinare Senior Secondary School opened in 2011. In August 2012, the Ministry of Education and Skills Development announced that it would be one of four senior secondary schools designated as Schools of Excellence from 2013. The other schools were Mogoditshane Senior Secondary School, Goodhope Senior Secondary School, and Nata Senior Secondary School.

== Academics and performance ==
The school offers the Botswana senior secondary curriculum, with emphasis on pre-vocational disciplines following its designation as a School of Excellence.

In the 2022 Botswana General Certificate of Secondary Education (BGCSE) examinations, the school improved its ranking from 31st to 19th out of 34 senior secondary schools.

In the 2025 BGCSE results, the school recorded 684 candidates, with 15.06% achieving 36 points or above.

== Extracurricular activities ==
The school has hosted sporting events, including the Phikwe Open.
