= John Mackenzie (missionary) =

Scottish Christian missionary

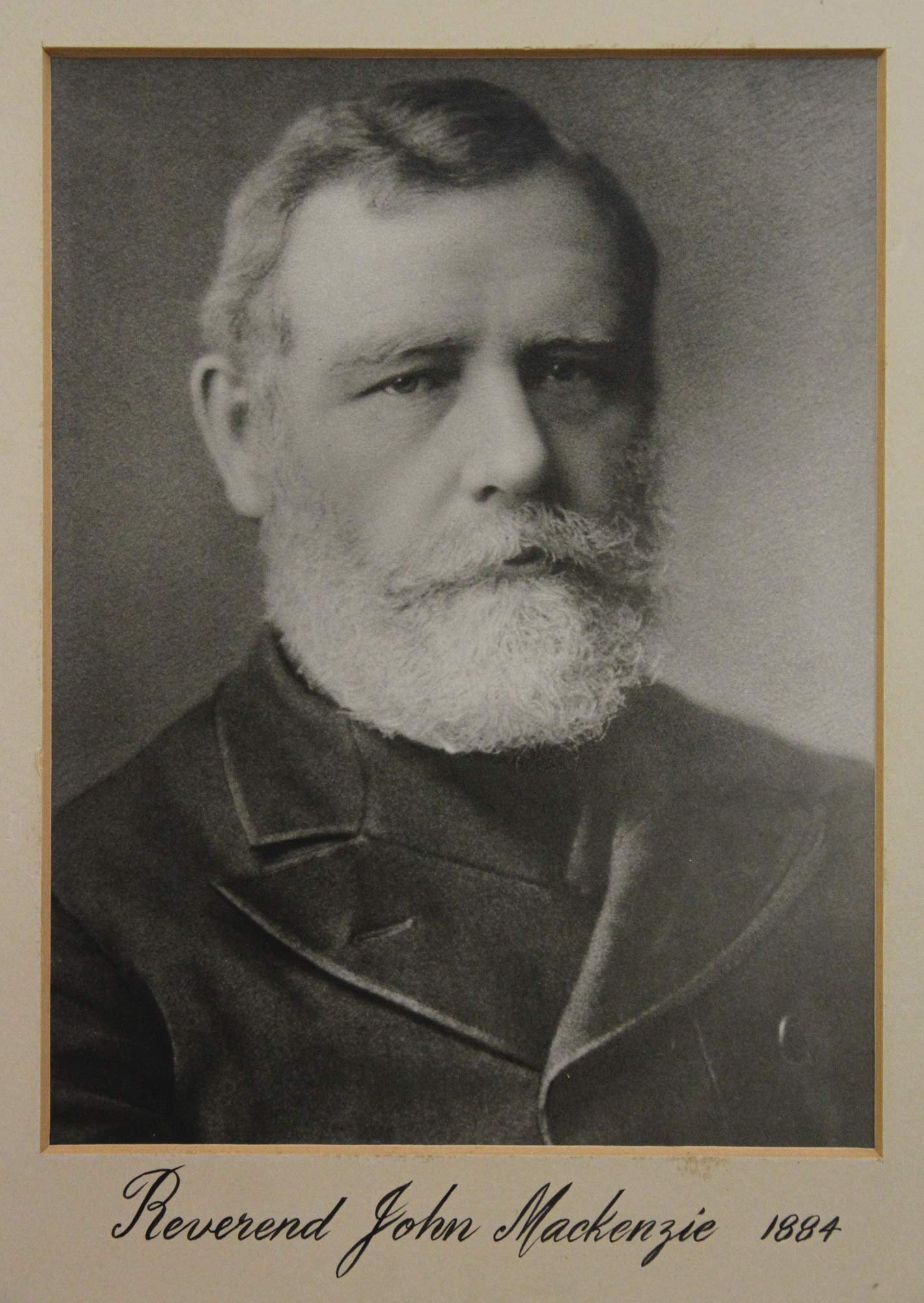
- Born: 30 August 1835; Knockando, Moray, Scotland
- Died: 23 March 1899 (aged 63); Kimberley, Cape Colony
- Occupations: Missionary, civil servant

John Mackenzie (30 August 1835 – 23 March 1899) was a Scottish Christian missionary who worked in Southern Africa, and who argued for the rights of the native Africans.

Mackenzie was born in Knockando, Moray, Scotland in 1835. He was a member of the London Missionary Society (now, the Council for World Mission) and volunteered with the organisation in 1855. Three years later, he went to Southern Africa and began his missionary work at Kuruman (where David Livingstone had earlier served), at that time in the northern part of Cape Colony. He thereafter continued that work among the Tswana people of what later became the Bechuanaland Protectorate. He became disturbed by encroachments into Tswana territory by Boers (Dutch-speaking European settlers) from the Republic of Transvaal. From 1867, he publicly urged that the United Kingdom adopt the Tswana territories as a protectorate, arguing that British rule would safeguard the rights of the Africans against the racism of the Boers. In 1884, the UK government established the protectorate of British Bechuanaland, and appointed Mackenzie its deputy commissioner. In 1885, he was replaced in that post by Cecil Rhodes, but retained considerable political influence. That same year, he took part in the Warren Expedition, one result of which was that British Bechuanaland was enlarged to the north to become the Bechuanaland Protectorate (modern Botswana). In 1889, he retired from public life and resumed his missionary activities.

He died on 23 March 1899 at Kimberley, Cape Colony.

John Mackenzie School, Francistown, Botswana was founded in 1899 as Francistown European School; in 1958, it was renamed in his honour.
