= Francistown Senior Secondary School =

- Francistown; Botswana

Information
- Type: Government of Botswana School
- Motto: Thuto ke boswa (Education is heritage)
- Established: 1978
- Sister school: Mater Spei College
- Principal: Mr Ntaise
- Chaplain: Naledi Sigwele (Deputy Headmaster)
- Grades: Form 4 (Grade 11), Form 5 (Grade 12)
- Gender: Co-educational
- Nickname: FSS / Berylin High (Berus)
- National ranking: 6

Francistown Senior Secondary School is a government institution located in Francistown, the second largest city in Botswana, with a population of about 100,079 and 150,800 inhabitants for its agglomeration at the 2011 census.

== History ==
Francistown Senior Secondary School was established in 1978 as a Community Junior Secondary School, in Francistown, Botswana The School had about 15 to 20 staff and was headed by Mr. L.B Gwathe during that time. The number of students enrolled in the school rounded up to 480 and classes accommodated 160 each, from form 1 classes to form 3. The school was financially assisted by the World Bank group, through the Government of Botswana because the school is government property.

In 2015, the Botswana Examinations Council rated it as the most improved school in Botswana.

=== Conversion into Senior Secondary School ===
In 1987, the school was converted into a Senior Secondary School. The conversion allowed the school to have only two classes which offered pure sciences and arts. The number of students increased and the staff also grew from 20 to 60 employees.

== See also ==
- Education in Botswana
