= Naledi Senior Secondary School =

Location
- P.O. Box 20527, Gaborone West, Gaborone; Botswana; 24°40′41″S 25°54′34″E

Information
- Type: Public (government) senior secondary school
- Established: 1978 (as junior secondary); 1990 (as senior secondary)
- School district: South East District
- Principal: Othusitse Othusitse (as of 2023)
- Grades: Form 4–5
- Enrolment: 1,670 (2018)

Naledi Senior Secondary School is a public senior secondary school in Gaborone, Botswana. Established in 1978 with funding from the World Bank’s Boipelego Project, it initially operated as a junior secondary school before transitioning to senior secondary status in 1990.

The school has a curriculum that offers humanities, sciences, and practical/vocational subjects and is structured around five student houses.

== History ==
Naledi Senior Secondary School was built and equipped by the World Bank through the Boipelego Project under the Ministry of Education and Skills Development. It opened in 1978 as a junior secondary school offering the Junior Certificate. It became a senior secondary school in 1990, with the last Junior Certificate examinations written in 1991.

The school marked its 40th anniversary in September 2018. At the time, enrolment stood at 1,670 students across Form 4 and Form 5 classes, supported by 132 teachers and 42 ancillary staff.

== Academics ==
Naledi is a multi-stream school with a designed capacity of 1,680 students.

In 2023, the school began implementing the Ministry of Basic Education's new vocational syllabus for Form 4 students, introducing subjects such as Clothing and Textile, Food Studies, Innovation and Design and Aesthetics. Students also received laptops as part of the national education transformation initiative.

The school is organised into five houses being Zebra, Cheetah, Buffalo, Giraffe, and Kudu each led by a Head of department. Student governance includes a prefect and class monitor system, with parental involvement through the Parent-Teacher Association.

== Performance ==
Naledi Senior Secondary School has a long record of strong academic performance. Between 2008 and 2013 it ranked in the national top five, achieving first position in 2009, 2010, and 2011 (with a record 70.19% pass rate in 2011).

In the 2025 BGCSE examinations, Naledi was reported as the top-performing government school nationally, with 39.06% of candidates achieving Grade C or better.

== Extracurricular activities ==
The school offers extracurricular activities including sports, debate, drama, and participation in Junior Achievement Botswana (which has represented the country internationally in Latvia, Zimbabwe, and South Africa), and various academic clubs including Maths and Science,and Writers Club.

== Notable alumni ==
- Visual artist-Itumeleng Junior Boitshwarelo.
