= Rainbow High =

Rainbow High may refer to:

- Rainbow High (book), a 2003 novel by Alex Sanchez
- Rainbow High (dolls), a line of dolls introduced in 2020, and an adapted web series
- Rainbow High School, Gaborone, Botswana
- "Rainbow High", a song from the Andrew Lloyd Webber musical Evita
