= Westwood International School =

School in Gaborone, Botswana

Coordinates: 24.6781°S 25.8875°E

Information
- Established: 1988; 37 years ago
- Grades: Kindergarten - Grade 13
- Language: English
- Website: www.westwood.ac.bw

Westwood International School is an English medium international school in Gaborone, Botswana. It was founded in 1988 with sponsorship from the American and British governments and in collaboration with the Botswana Ministry of Education. US, British and South African teaching materials are employed.

== History ==
Westwood International School was founded in May 1988 under the sponsorship of the British and American governments and local companies in collaboration with the Botswana Ministry of Education.

== Educational program ==
The school's educational program extends from kindergarten through grade 13. The school year, beginning in January and ending in December, comprises 3 trimesters: mid-January to mid-April, mid-May to early August, and mid-September to early December.

== Fees and finances ==
During the 2015–2016 school year over 97% of the school's income derives from tuition fees. Annual tuition rates, in US Dollars, are as follows:

Grade	Rate
Kdg.- 3	$5,380
4-6	$5,700
7	$7,300
8-9	$8,300
10-11	$9,100
12-13	$9,300

(Accurate as of March 13, 2017) For new students, there is a one-time, non-refundable fee of BWP 20,000, (Approx USD 2,000). There is also a testing fee.

== See also ==
- Maru-a-Pula School
- St. Joseph's College, Kgale
