= Zesta =

African food delivery service company

- Formerly: Square Eats
- Type: Private
- Industry: Logistics
- Founded: August 2020; 6 years ago
- Founders: Henry Newman; Randall Newman
- Headquarters: Gaborone, Botswana
- Area served: Africa
- Services: Delivery (commerce)
- Website: zesta.one

Zesta is an online food ordering and delivery platform operating across the African region. Formerly known as Square Eats, the company rebranded to Zesta in 2025. Zesta connects customers with restaurants and stores, offering delivery services for food, groceries, parcel delivery and other essentials.

== History ==
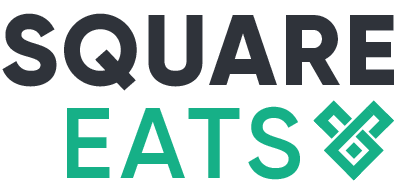
Square Eats logo

Zesta was originally founded as Square Eats in 2020 by twin brothers Henry Newman and Randall Newman when they were 21 years old. It was launched in Gaborone, Botswana, and quickly gained traction as a leading food delivery service in the country.

The company halted operations and took a strategic decision to reinvent the business in 2022. In 2025, the company announced its rebranding to Zesta, highlighting its commitment to evolving beyond food delivery to become a super app.

=== COVID-19 initiative ===
During the COVID-19 pandemic, Zesta (then Square Eats) implemented measures to ensure safety and hygiene, including providing free gloves and hand sanitizer to drivers and introducing contactless delivery options. These efforts positioned the platform as a trusted service during the pandemic.

== Service ==
Zesta facilitates delivery from a wide range of merchant partners via a smartphone app, available on iOS and Android platforms, or through its website. Customers can browse their favorite restaurants, place orders, and have meals delivered to their doorstep efficiently.

== See also ==
- DoorDash
- Rappi
- Talabat
- Mascom
- Randall Newman
