= Lobatse Senior Secondary School =

Coordinates: 25.2041°S 25.6782°E

- Lobatse. Botswana

Information
- Type: Government of Botswana School
- Motto: Work Conquers All
- Established: 1946
- Principal: Mrs Motlhageng
- Grades: Form 4 (Grade 11), Form 5 (Grade 12)
- Gender: Co-educational
- Colours: White, Black, Green
- Nickname: LOBSEC
- National ranking: 5

Lobatse Senior Secondary School is a government institution located in Lobatse, Botswana. It was established in the colonial era as a private school for whites but has been a public school since 1966 after independence. It received over 1000 students every year from different schools in the Southern District. It has boarding facilities which offer accommodation to students from far villages. Although it is known for doing well academically and in sports, it is also known as a school with undisciplined students. It was the only school in Botswana with over 10 security guards and students were monitored by the police during lunch to make sure there was no trouble in the dining hall. The school has a foundation named Lobatse Secondary school foundation that supports it by providing financial aid in the form of scholarships and grants in various areas including academic & non academic.

== See also ==
- Education in Botswana
