= Supa Ngwao Museum =

Museum in Botswana

- Francistown Museum

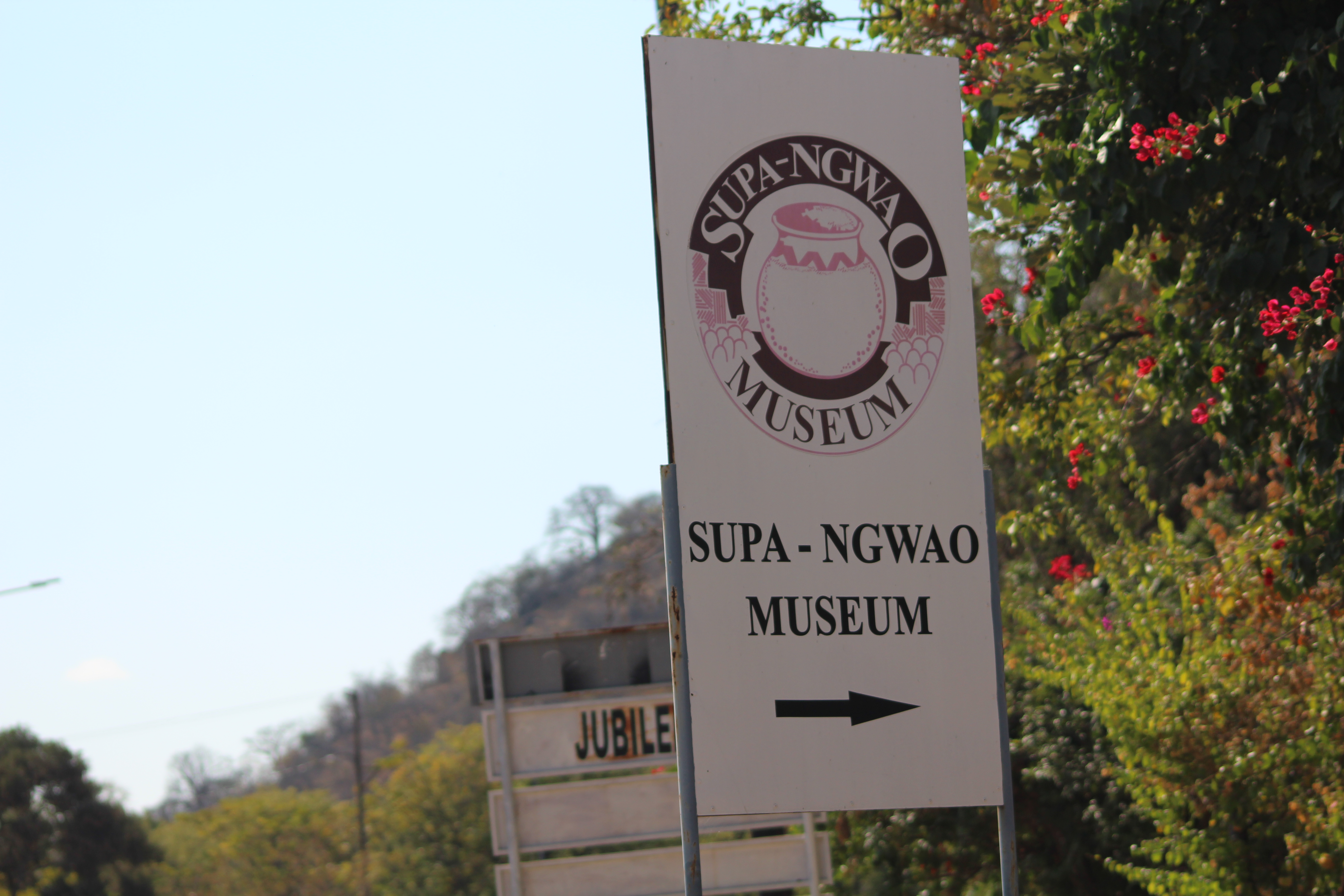
- Supa Ngwao Museum in Francistown, Botswana
- Established: 1986
- Location: Francistown, Botswana
- Coordinates: 21°10′25″S 27°30′45″E
- Collection size: History of Botswana
- Website: https://museum-francistown.org/

The Supa Ngwao Museum is located in the Francistown city in Botswana. It is the Regional Museum for Francistown and the North East Region (the North East District and adjacent areas of the Central District). It is a public institution dedicated to human history, culture, tradition and crafts from north east Botswana. The museum was established in the year 1986, largely to preserve the historical information about the Francistown city and other places around it in the northern region. Supa Ngwao museum is responsible for showcasing the history and culture of Kalanga people. There are three sections at the Supa museum including the museum, information center and the craft shop.

== History ==
Supa Ngwao museum was first established as a mobile museum with the main aim of preserving, teaching about the human history's, arts and culture of the Kalanga people and people living in northern Botswana.

== Gallery of Supa Ngwao Museum ==
Supa Ngwao Museum of (Francistown) Botswana Pictures

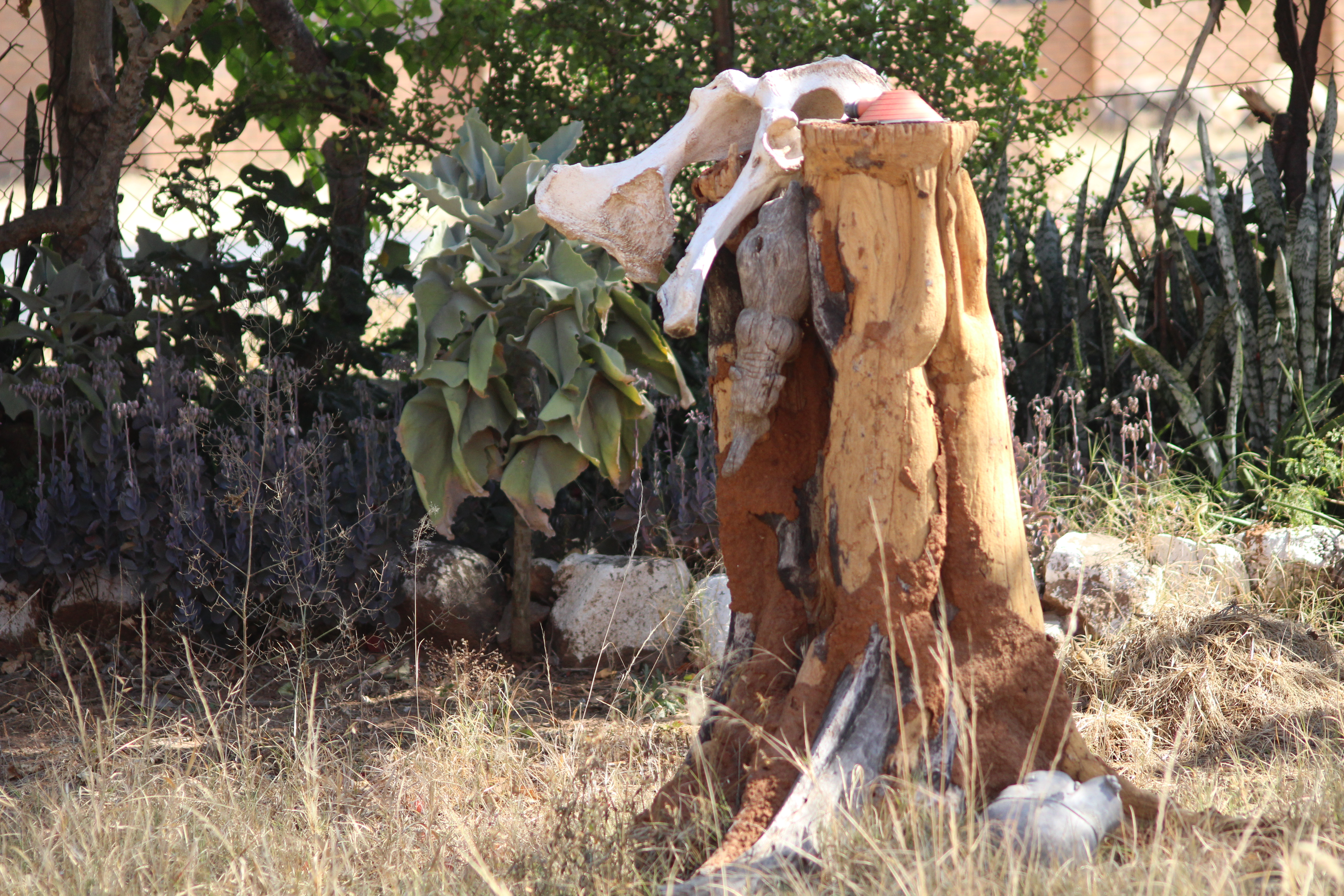
Historical animal remains at Supa ngwao museum Francistown, Botswana

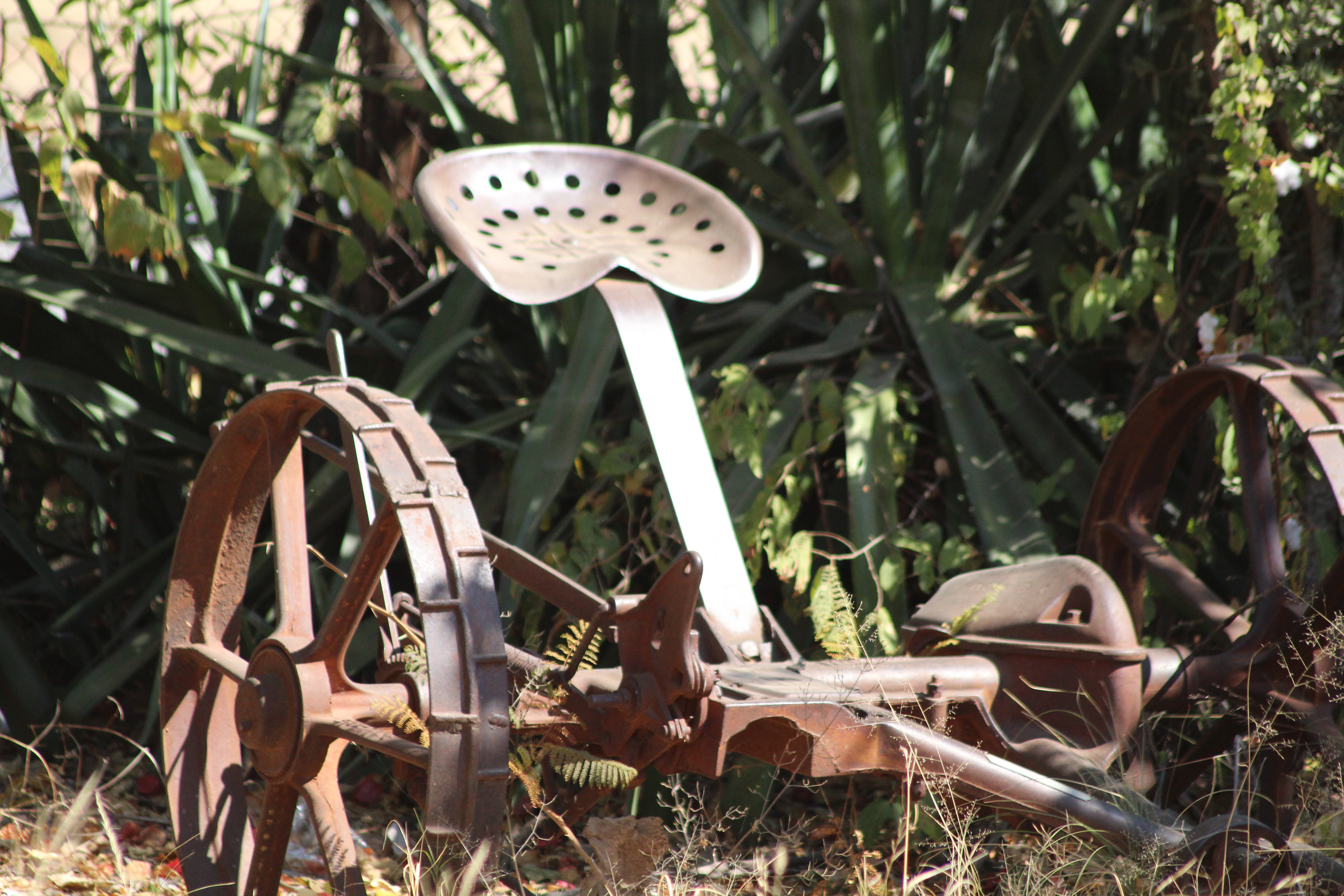
Historical artefacts at Supa ngwao museum Francistown, Botswana

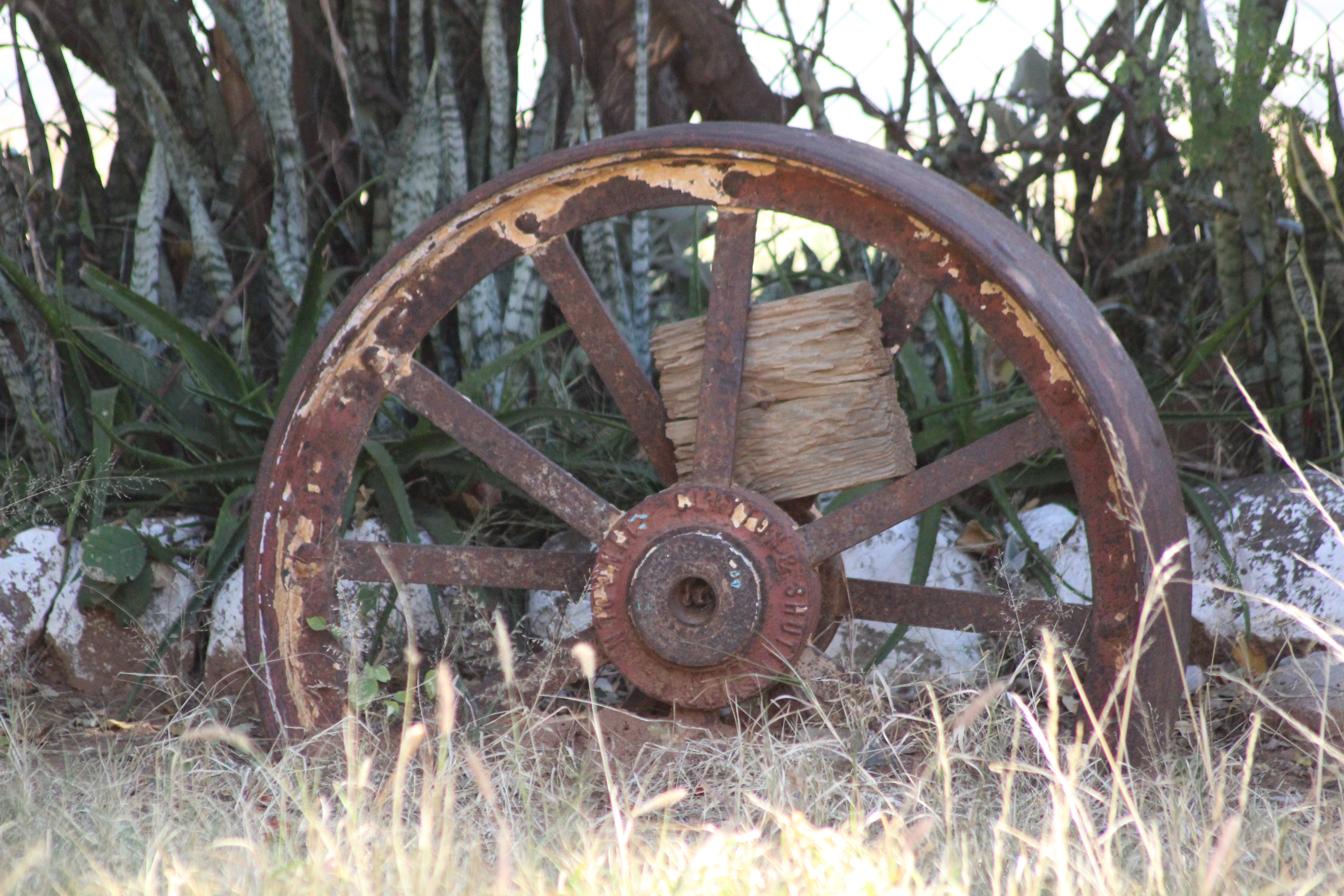
Farm Wheel used in the past found at Supa Ngwao Museum
