= Mater Spei College =

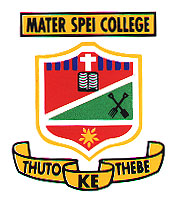
- Francistown; Botswana

Information
- Type: Government-aided mission school
- Religious affiliation: Roman Catholic
- Established: 1963; 63 years ago
- Sister school: St. Joseph's College, Kgale
- Principal: Ma Smarts
- Grades: Form 4 (Grade 11), Form 5 (Grade 12)
- Gender: Co-educational
- Nickname: Maters, MSC
- National ranking: 2

Mater Spei College is a government-aided Catholic secondary school located in Francistown, Botswana. It educates a mixture of boarding and day scholar students in grades (11-12) or form 4 and form 5.

== Location ==
Mater Spei College is located in Botswana's second-largest city, Francistown, in northern Botswana. it is now headed by Mr B. Bajiti as the school head of the present Mater Spei

== History ==
Mater Spei College was founded by the Roman Catholic church in 1963. Mater Spei was part of a major development plan by the Roman Catholic church, driven partly by the enthronement of Urban Murphy as the country's first Catholic bishop. It was only the seventh secondary school to be opened in Botswana; the second Catholic secondary school in the country, and one of a number of education developments driven by Christian missions which emerged in the late 1950s.

The school received considerable financial support from the Botswana government, which made significant capital investment in building projects at the school to support the institution's expansion in its early years. As a result the school was able to expand from one stream per year in 1965 to 20 classes in 1975. In 1979 the school expanded to take over the grounds of the adjoining Our Lady of the Desert Primary School.

== School and the learning environment ==
In 2020 Mater Spei had approximately 1,750 students. The school has facilities including double-storey classrooms, a multi-purpose hall and a networked (Internet-connected) library.

In 2018 the school had the second highest academic results in Botswana for the country's BGCE examinations.

== Subjects taught ==
Mater Spei College has twelve subject departments, which includes:

1. Religious Education
2. English Language
3. Mathematics
4. Science

 [french]

=== Optional Subjects ===
1. Design and Technology
2. Art and Craft
3. Development Studies
4. Business Studies
5. Geography
6. Home Economics
7. Agriculture
8. English Literature
9. History
10. Setswana language

A 2016 study found that this school was ahead of others in information and communications technology because of equipment and software provided by a local mining company.

== See also ==
- St. Joseph's College, Kgale
- Education in Botswana
- Mathangwane Village
