= Goodhope Senior Secondary School =

Coordinates: 25.464°S 25.412°E

Location
- Private Bag 005, Goodhope; Botswana

Information
- Type: Public senior secondary school
- Established: 2008
- School district: Southern District
- Grades: Form 4–5
- Enrolment: c. 2,000 (2017)

Goodhope Senior Secondary School is a public senior secondary school in Goodhope, Southern District, Botswana. The school opened in 2008 and has been the subject of media reports concerning infrastructural challenges and student unrest.

== History ==
Goodhope Senior Secondary School opened in 2008. Early reports noted shortages of resources including books, desks, hostel equipment and water supply challenges.

The school has experienced periods of student unrest and disciplinary incidents, including a rampage in 2014 and a temporary closure in 2017.

A long-standing water shortage at the school was addressed in May 2019 with the commissioning of two boreholes.

== Academics and performance ==
In its early years, the school recorded a 39.27% pass rate in its first Botswana General Certificate of Secondary Education (BGCSE) results, placing sixth out of 28 schools.

In 2018, the school recorded a 10.9% pass rate (Grade C or better).

== See also ==
- Mmadinare Senior Secondary School
- Mogoditshane Senior Secondary School
