= Itumeleng Junior Boitshwarelo =

Motswana painter (born 1998)

- Born: c. 1998; Gaborone, Botswana
- Known for: Surrealist murals, graffiti art, and painting on unconventional surfaces
- Movement: Surrealism
- Website: https://www.behance.net/itumelengboitshw26

Itumeleng Junior Boitshwarelo (born c. 1998), also known as Artist ItumelengIJB or IJB, is a Motswana visual artist, muralist, painter, digital artist, and designer. He is known for surrealist works that combine African cultural themes with contemporary visual techniques, often using spray paint on unconventional surfaces such as plastic, wood, steel, and walls.

== Early life and education ==
Boitshwarelo was born and raised in Gaborone, Botswana. He developed an early interest in drawing during preschool, where a classroom exercise led him to recognise his artistic ability.

He began formal engagement with art at Bokamoso Junior Secondary School and Naledi Senior Secondary School. During this period, he experimented with non-traditional materials, including painting on vinyl records.

He later studied for a Bachelor of Design (Honours) in Professional Design at Limkokwing University of Creative Technology, graduating in 2022.

He has cited both local and international influences in his artistic development, including Botswana artist Wilson Ngoni and visual artist Fabion Millian.

== Career ==
Boitshwarelo began experimenting with spray paint in 2016, initially producing graffiti-style markings in public spaces. He later expanded into mural work and large-scale visual installations.

A key development in his practice occurred during the 2020 COVID-19 lockdown in Botswana, when he began working with spray paint on plastic wrap and other fabricated surfaces, developing a signature experimental style.

He has participated in multiple exhibitions and competitions, including:

- Thapong Visual Arts Centre exhibitions (2014–2019)
- Botswana National Youth Council Art Fair (2014–2016)
- Presidents’ Day Competitions (2018–2019)
- Solo exhibition in Montgomery, Alabama (2018)

His commissioned works include murals and live art performances for public and private spaces such as SPAR, Kalafhi Hospital, Limkokwing University, and various cultural events.

As of 2025, he is based in Pretoria, South Africa, while continuing to work on projects connected to Botswana.

== Artistic style ==
Boitshwarelo works primarily in surrealism, focusing on themes such as imagination, identity, emotion, and personal growth. His work often incorporates African cultural references and storytelling elements.

He is known for using spray paint combined with unconventional materials including plastic, wood, and metal surfaces, creating textured and experimental compositions.

One of his works, This Age of Scattered Attention, explores themes of personal development and emotional reflection.

== Selected works ==
- This Age of Scattered Attention (painting)
- Murals include: Main Deck Mural, VISUAL EPIPHANY "Kgotla Mural", Fathers & Feathers Mural, PULA SPAR Mural, KO TAUNG Mural, BRUTAL FRUIT Mural, Limkokwing University tribute mural (2022), Kids Hospital Room Mural (Kalafhi), CORONA SUNSETS live mural, and others.
