= Botswana Examination Council =

Educational qualification provider in Botswana

- Abbreviation: BEC
- Location: Gaborone
- Coordinates: 24.6366608°S 25.8928871°E
- Services: Examinations and academic assessments
- Official language: English; Setswana
- Website: www.bec.co.bw

Botswana Examinations Council (BEC) is a provider of national qualifications, offering examinations and qualifications to schools in Botswana.

O Level logo

== Qualifications ==
BEC provides Key Stage examinations for primary and secondary schools across Botswana. It offers Primary School Leaving Examination (PSLE), Junior Certificate Examination (JCE), and Botswana General Certificate of Secondary Education (BGCSE).

== Primary programme ==
Botswana Examinations Council offers a primary programme of 7 years, providing curriculum support for affiliated primary schools.

== Curriculum ==
=== Primary School Leaving Examination (PSLE) ===
| Subject | Core | Optional |
|---|---|---|
| Agriculture | ✓ | |
| English Language | ✓ | |
| Environmental Science | ✓ | |
| Mathematics | ✓ | |
| Religious & Moral Education | ✓ | |
| Setswana | ✓ | |
| Science | ✓ | |
| Social Studies | ✓ | |

=== Junior Certificate Examination (JCE) ===
==== Grading ====
The pass grades for JCE are, from highest to lowest, A*, A, B, C, D, E and U. The maximum aggregate is 63.

- Merit: the candidate obtains a numeric aggregate of 90.
- A: the candidate obtains a numeric aggregate of 80 - 89.
- B: the candidate obtains a numeric aggregate of 60 - 79
- C: the candidate obtains a numeric aggregate of 50 - 59.
- D: the candidate obtains a numeric aggregate of 30 - 49.
- E: the candidate obtains a numeric aggregate of 26 - 29.

==== Subjects offered ====
| Subject | Core | Optional |
|---|---|---|
| Accounting & Office Procedure | | |
| Agriculture | core | |
| Art | | ✓ |
| Business Studies & Commerce | | ✓ |
| Commerce | | ✓ |
| Design & Technology | | ✓ |
| English Language | core | |
| French | | ✓ |
| Home Economics | | ✓ |
| Mathematics | core | |
| Music | | ✓ |
| Physical Education | | ✓ |
| Religious Education | | ✓ |
| Science | core | |
| Setswana | core | |
| Moral Education | core | |
| Social Studies | core | |

=== Botswana General Certificate of Secondary Education (BG) ===
==== Grading ====
The pass grades for BGCSE are, from highest to lowest, A*, A, B, C, D, E, F, G and U. The process to decide these grades involves the uniform mark scheme (UMS). Achieving less than 29% results in a U (unclassified). The maximum points a student can get is 48 points in six subjects. The table below shows the general grading system which is used when grading students in senior secondary which may be changed by BEC due to standardization.

| Grade | Percentage (%) | Points |
|---|---|---|
| A* | 90 - 100 | 9 |
| A | 85 - 89 | 9 |
| B | 78 - 84 | 7 |
| C | 60 - 77 | 5 |
| D | 40 - 59 | 3 |
| E | 26 - 39 | 1 |
| U | 0 - 25 | 0 |

==== Studying ====
The number of AMS taken by students can vary. A typical route is to study eight+ subjects including core subjects. Five is usually the minimum number of credits required for university entrance, with some universities specifying the need for six subjects that are all C+. There is no limit set on the number of subjects one can study, and a number of students take 9 or more subjects.

==== Subjects offered ====
A wide variety of subjects are offered at O-level by the Botswana Examinations Council. This table shows the majority of subjects which are consistently available for study.

| Subject | Core | Optional |
|---|---|---|
| Accounting | | ✓ |
| Additional Mathematics | | ✓ |
| Agriculture | | ✓ |
| Art | | ✓ |
| Biology | ✓ | |
| Business Studies | | ✓ |
| Chemistry | ✓ | |
| Commerce | | ✓ |
| Computer Studies | | ✓ |
| Design & Technology | | ✓ |
| English Language | ✓ | |
| English Literature | | ✓ |
| Fashion & Fabrics | | ✓ |
| French | | ✓ |
| Food & Nutrition | | ✓ |
| Geography | | ✓ |
| History | | ✓ |
| Home Management | | ✓ |
| Mathematics | ✓ | |
| Music | | ✓ |
| Physical Education | | ✓ |
| Physics | ✓ | |
| Religious Education | | ✓ |
| Science Double Award | ✓ | |
| Setswana | ✓ | |
| Statistics | | ✓ |

== See also ==
- General Certificate of Education (GCE)
- GCE Ordinary Level
- St. Joseph's College, Kgale
