= Botho University =

Private university in Botswana

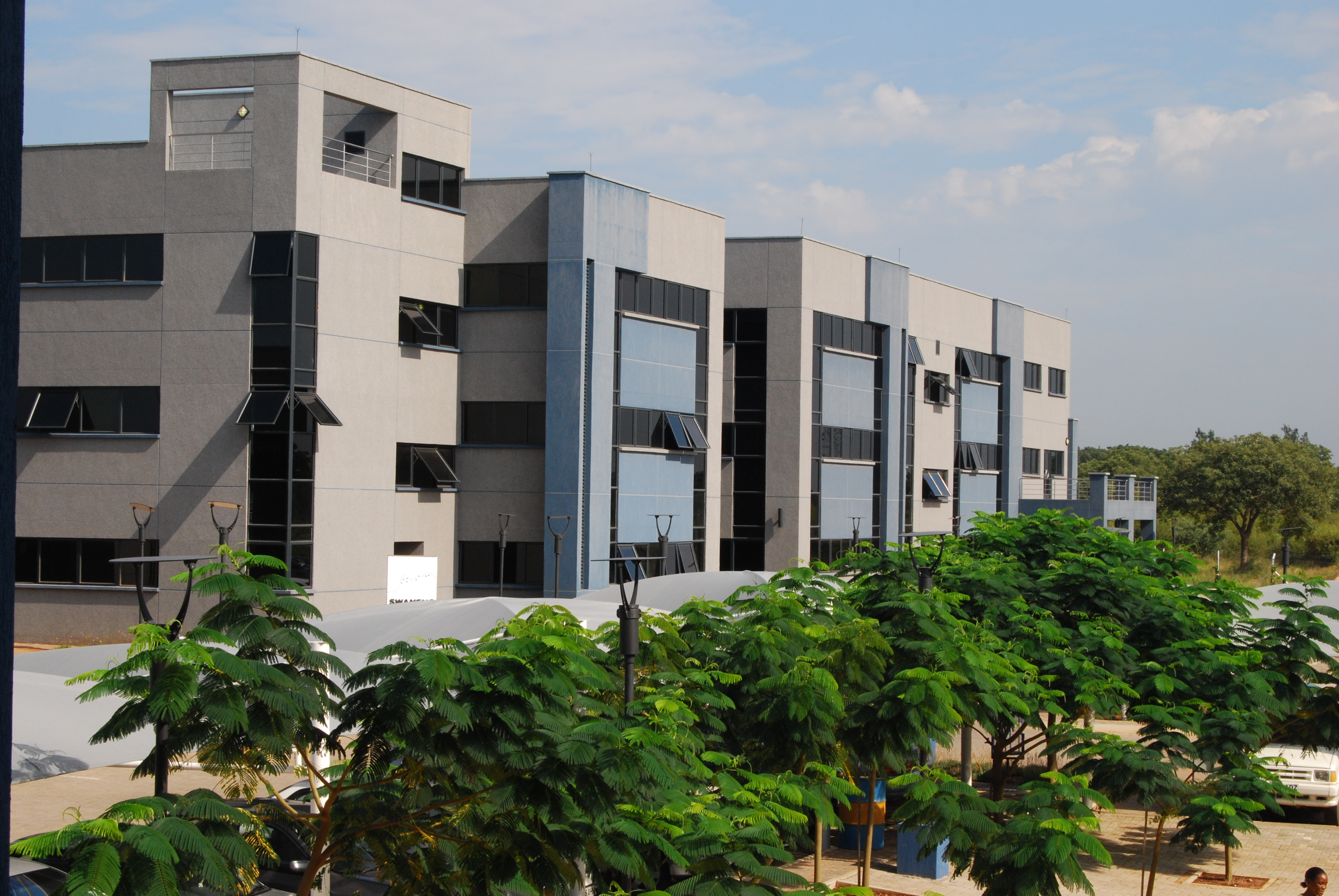
- Swaneng Building on campus
- Former name: Botho College
- Motto: Excellence, Leadership, Innovation
- Type: Private
- Established: 1997; 29 years ago
- Chairman: Jay Ramesh
- Vice-Chancellor: Sheela Raja Ram
- Director: Sheela Raja Ram
- Administrative staff: 400+
- Students: 4000+
- Location: Gaborone, Botswana
- Campus: Gaborone, Francistown, Manzini, Maseru and an affiliate Botho Higher Education institution (BHEI) Windhoek
- Language: English
- Colors: Maroon, navy blue and white
- Website: bothouniversity.com

Botho University (formerly known as Botho College/NIIT) is Botswana's largest private tertiary educational provider, founded in 1997. The college offers certificates, diplomas and graduate degrees in accountancy and computer science. It is the first private tertiary institution in the country to be accredited by the Tertiary Education Council (TEC). All of its programs are also accredited by the Botswana Qualification Authority (BQA). It has trained 16,000 graduates, and enrolls 4,000 students, supported by 150 academic staff.

Botho's Computing Science programs are partnered with international institutions such as NIIT, Open University and Teesside University.

== Extra-curricular activities ==
=== Botho University Linkz ICT Challenge ===
In 2009, Botho University launched an ICT-based competition called LINKZ The ICT Challenge, which brings together the best ICT students in the country. For this competition Botho University launched a page on their website. It tests students' knowledge in the field of company technology. In 2009, Linkz ICT Challenge brought together more than 300 young people from tertiary institutions including University of Botswana, Gaborone Institute of Professional Studies, Ba Isago College, ABM University, and Limkowing University of Creative Technology.

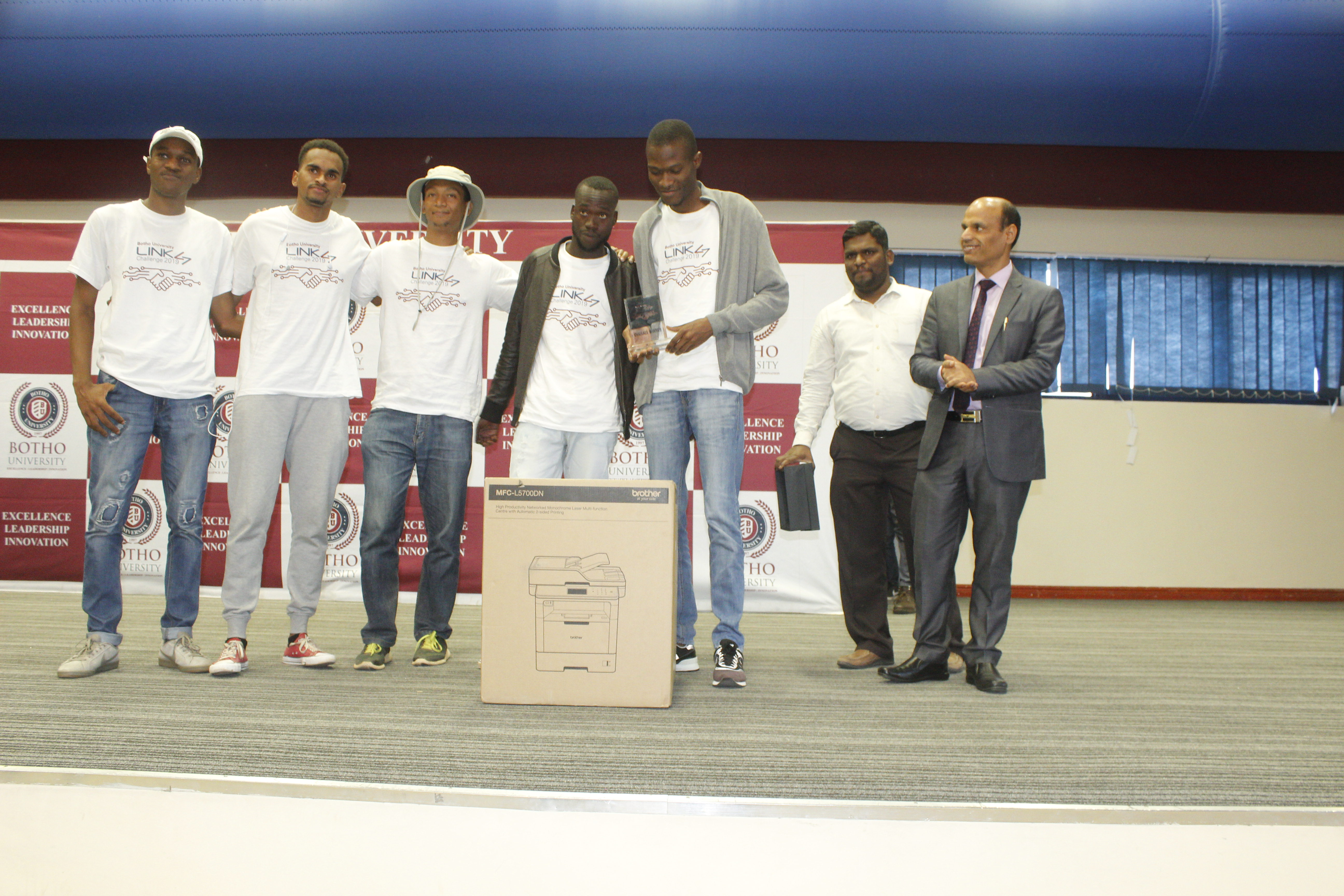
OVERALL BEST WINNERS ON THE TERTIARY CATEGORY- BOTHO UNIVERSITY, GABORONE CAMPUS

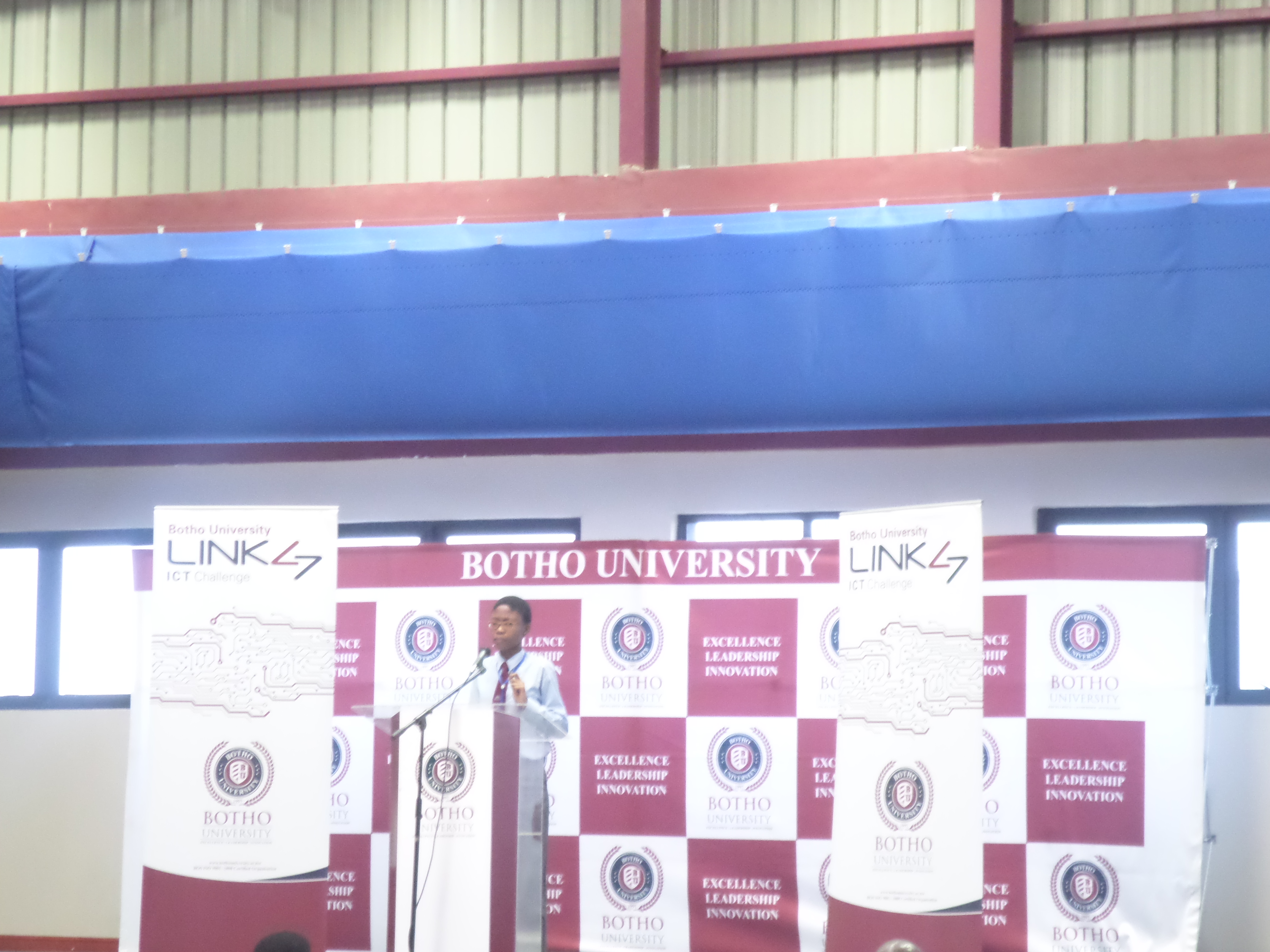
St. Joseph's College student giving a public speaking presentation during Linkz Competition 2016

== See also ==
- University of Botswana
