= Theo Baloyi =

CEO of Bathu

- Born: Theo Baloyi; Hammanskraal, Gauteng
- Citizenship: South Africa
- Education: University of South Africa
- Occupations: Entrepreneur; shoe designer; Businessperson
- Years active: 2013–present
- Known for: Founding Bathu Shoes.
- Title: Founder and CEO of Bathu Shoes Founder and CEO Avenue Exchange
- Awards: Forbes Africa 30 under 30 (2019); GQ Business Leader of the Year (2021)

Theo Baloyi is a South African entrepreneur, and the founder and chief executive officer of Bathu Shoes. He launched his eponymous shoe brand in 2015, having previously served as a Senior Associate at PwC in Dubai. He was featured in the Forbes 30 Under 30 list in 2019. In 2021, he won GQ's Business Leader of the Year.

== Early life ==
Baloyi was born and raised in Hammanskraal, Gauteng, where he also spent his childhood. His father, Solly Baloyi, quit his nursing job to become a real estate agent and died in 2014. His mother is Tshidi Baloyi and he has a sister called Goitsimang Baloyi. Baloyi's childhood education was at Shalom Primary School, followed by high school. In 2009, Baloyi relocated to Johannesburg and studied BCom Accounting at the University of South Africa.

== Career ==
Before leaving the University of South Africa, Baloyi began his entrepreneurship journey by selling perfumes door-to-door. Baloyi was then selected to work for PwC South Africa under their graduate program, his performance prompting the company to hire him on a full-time basis, and he was transferred to PwC Middle East in Dubai.

In 2015 Baloyi founded Bathu, a shoe company. The company owns and operates over 30 stores across South Africa and the SADC region. He was appointed a board member of South African Council of Shopping Centres (SACSC) in July 2022.

== Personal life ==
Baloyi lives in Eye of Africa, Johannesburg.

== See also ==
- Bridgette Radebe
- Randall Newman
- Phuti Mahanyele
