= Education in Botswana =

Flag of Botswana
- Minister of Child Welfare and Basic Education Minister of Higher Education Deputy: Ms Nono Kgafela-Mokoka Hon Mooketsi Prince Maele Hon Justin Hunyepa

General details
- Primary languages: English, Setswana
- System type: State, private

In Botswana, the responsibilities for education fall under the Ministry of Child welfare and Basic Education and the Ministry of Higher Education; which oversees basic, secondary, and tertiary education, as well as vocational and skills training. The ministry's functions include policy formation and implementation, curriculum development, teacher training, and the administration of schools across the country.

The Private schools are generally free to determine their own curriculum and staffing policies, with voluntary accreditation available through independent regional accreditation authorities. About 87% of school-age children attend public schools, about 10% attend private schools while roughly 3% are home-schooled.

Education is compulsory over an age range starting between five and eight and ending somewhere between ages sixteen and eighteen. This requirement can be satisfied in public schools, state-certified private schools, or an approved home school program.

Secondary education in Botswana is neither free nor compulsory. In 2002, the gross primary enrollment rate was 103 percent, and the net primary enrollment rate was 81 percent. Gross and net enrollment ratios are based on the number of students formally registered in primary school and therefore do not necessarily reflect school attendance. Recent primary school attendance statistics are not available for Botswana. As of 2001, 86 percent of children who started primary school were likely to reach grade 5. In Botswana's education system, girls and boys have equal access to education. Girls are likely to drop out of secondary school due to pregnancy.

There is also a large number and a wide variety of publicly and privately administered institutions of higher learning throughout the country. Post-secondary education, divided into college, as the first tertiary degree, and graduate school, is described in a separate section below.

Botswana made great strides in educational development after independence in 1966. At that time there were very few graduates in the country and very few Batswana attended secondary school. With the discovery of diamonds just after independence and the increase in government revenue that this brought, there was a huge increase in educational provision in the country. All students were guaranteed ten years of basic education, leading to a Junior Certificate qualification. Approximately half of the school population attends a further two years of secondary schooling leading to the award of the Botswana General Certificate of Education. After leaving school, students can attend one of the seven technical colleges in the country, or take vocational training courses in teaching or nursing. The best students enter the University of Botswana, Botswana University of Agriculture and Natural Resources, The Botswana Accountancy College and Boitekanelo College in Gaborone. A larger influx of tertiary students is expected when construction of the nation's second national university, The Botswana International University of Science and Technology, is completed. Many other students end up in the numerous private tertiary education colleges around the country. A high majority of these students are government sponsored. The quantitative gains have not always been matched by qualitative ones. Primary schools in particular still lack resources, and the teachers are less well paid than their secondary school colleagues. In January 2006, Botswana announced the reintroduction of school fees after two decades of free state education.

Total government expenditure on education as percentage of GDP in Botswana was reported to be 9.633% in 2009, the highest among Sub-Saharan African countries.

== Education stages ==
=== Preschool ===
Preschool encompasses non-compulsory classroom-based early-childhood education prior to the age of five to six. Issues of Early Childhood Care and education were incorporated into the Revised National Policy on Education (RNPE) of 1994. The responsibility to provide early childhood education programs lies largely with the private and civil society sectors rather than with the government. The practices of providers of early childhood education are either simply "business opportunity seeking" responses to the new consumption patterns of more affluent parent (or guardian) or current global trends of child education preparation. Many community-based programs, commercial enterprises, non-profit organizations, faith communities, and independent childcare providers offer preschool education. Preschool may be general or may have a particular focus, such as arts education, religious education, sports training, or foreign language learning, along with providing general education. The benefit of pre-primary education cannot be over-emphasized because children develop cognitively and socially.

Botswana government as of 2015 has started opening early childhood education programs in many governmental primary schools in order to promote the education of young children. This started by opening a half-year pre-school class after the standard 7 students had finished writing their final exams. Their classrooms would be unoccupied for the rest of the academic year, so this way they could accommodate the 5-year-old children. Proceeding that, the government is now implementing a two-year program for children aged 4 and 5 years old. Moreover, the government of Botswana is also paying more attention to early childhood education.

=== Primary Education ===
Primary education ranges from reception (pre-standard one) up to standard 7.

Children enrol in primary school around the age of 6. The curriculum in primary education is determined by county school system. The school district selects curriculum guides and textbooks that reflect a state's learning standards and benchmarks for a given grade level. There are two types of primary education accessible in Botswana. The government provides education that is generally referred to as 'Setswana medium', the medium of instruction being Setswana as well as English. The private sector provides education whereby the language of instruction is purely English, these schools are referred to as 'English medium schools'.

=== Secondary Education ===
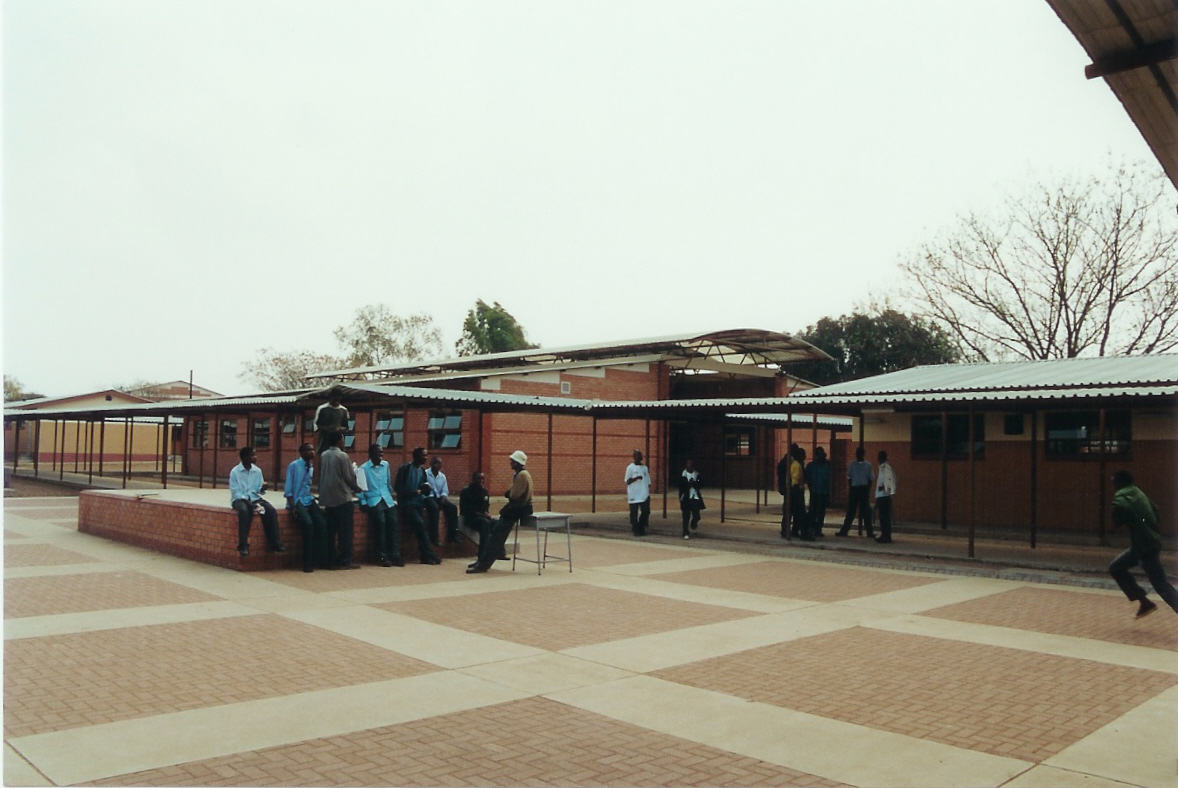
Kgari Sechele Secondary School, a government run secondary school.

Secondary education ranges from form 1 up to form 5 (junior secondary: form 1—form 3; senior secondary: form 4—form 5).

Students are usually given more independence, moving to different classrooms for different subjects, and being allowed to choose some of their class subjects (electives). The first three years of secondary education leads to the Junior Certificate, and after two more years of studying students sit for the Botswana General Certificate of Secondary Examination.

=== Higher education ===
The University of Botswana, Botho University, Limkokwing University of Creative Technology, Ba Isago University, ABM University College, Botswana International University of Science and Technology, Botswana Open University, Botswana University of Agriculture and Natural Resources, Gaborone University College of Law and professional Studies, and Gaborone Institute Of Professional Studies are the institutions that offer university education in the country. The University of Botswana is the national university which was established in 1982 by an act of parliament and is headquartered at Gaborone.

== Localization of the curriculum ==
Soon after independence it was realized that the educational system did not meet the needs of the nation. It was highly focused on academics and still had colonial hangovers. Many of the things taught were not relevant to the African context, thus the school drop-out rates were high. It was soon realized that change was needed. The leaders envisioned an education system that provided access to all and supported social harmony after the realization that the Botswana community was isolated according to different ethnic groups. In 1977 a commission appointed by the government of Botswana published a report on educational reform: 'education for kagisano' (meaning 'education for social harmony'). This first National Policy on Education (NPE) of 1977 was a reaction by Botswana leaders to move away from the British colonization model of learning to a more inclusive system when education was for the elite. As advised in the report, new core subjects were introduced into schools, making the education more relevant for Botswana. The education aimed to be more vocational in order to prepare students for the job market.

== See also ==
- List of schools in Botswana
- Ministry of Education and Skills Development
- Ministry of Tertiary Education, Research, Science and Technology (Botswana)
- St. Joseph's College, Kgale
