= Elliot Moshoke =

Motswana businessman

- Born: 1980 (age 45–46); Mahalapye, Botswana
- Citizenship: Botswana
- Education: University of South Africa; University of Botswana
- Occupations: Entrepreneur; businessperson
- Years active: 2002–present
- Known for: Founder and CEO of Acute Global Limited
- Website: elliotmoshoke.com

Elliot Moshoke is a Motswana entrepreneur, and the founder and group chief executive officer (CEO) of Acute Global Limited. He launched the group of companies in 2017, a separate spinoff of their family company Moshoke Ranch, founded in 1979.

== Early life and education ==
Moshoke was born and raised in Mahalapye where he also spent his childhood.

He holds a Bachelor of Finance degree from University of Botswana. He has also obtained a Law degree (LLB) from University of South Africa.

== Career ==
=== Acute Global Limited ===
In 2017, he founded Acute Global, his family-owned group investment holding company. The group of companies is a 100% Botswana-owned investment holding company with primary interests in financial services and food retail.

As of 2022 the group operated nine Payless supermarkets in the country.

=== Western Insurance Group ===
Following PSG Group's exit from Botswana, Moshoke's Acute Group acquired both the Western Life Insurance Botswana (Proprietary) Limited, which was renamed to WestLife Insurance Botswana and Western Insurance, now WestSure Insurance Botswana which started operating in Botswana in June 2018, and licensed insurers registered with the Non-Bank Financial Institutions Regulatory Authority ("NBFIRA"). In 2021, the Company shareholding changed, with Acute Global Limited having purchased 100% shareholding through Boago Emerging Markets, part of the Acute Global Limited group of companies. Western Life Insurance Botswana is a member of the Association of Life Underwriters Botswana. In April 2021, Boikanyo Kgosidintsi was appointed as the new chief executive officer to run the business, immediate focus being operational and financial resilience.

=== Payless ===
On April 14, 2021, Moshoke led an acquisition of Payless, the oldest supermarket chain in Botswana, a move that saw the first retail chain get in the hands of an indigenous Motswana. Payless Supermarket, founded in Botswana in 1990, making it the first FMCG chain store in Botswana. The supermarket was going through a liquidation process and Moshoke, through Ellis Retail Group, acquired Payless.

Moshoke was also a director of the retail company Hungbots Limited until 2015.

== Politics ==
Moshoke is a member of the Umbrella for Democratic Change (UDC), and an ally of its leader Duma Boko. In April 2014, while defending Duma Boko, Moshoke threatened to kill Isaac Kgosi, the director of Botswana national intelligence Directorate on Intelligence and Security.
