= Maru-a-Pula School =

Independent school in Gaborone, Botswana

Maru-a-Pula School (MaP)

Location
- Gaborone, Botswana; 24.6472°S 25.9329°E

Information
- Type: Independent
- Established: 1972
- Staff: Principal: Nick Evans
- Faculty: about 70
- Enrollment: over 750

Maru-a-Pula School is a co-educational, independent day and boarding secondary school in Gaborone, Botswana. It was founded in 1972.

The school prepares students for the Cambridge International General Certificate of Education (IGCSE), Advanced Subsidiary (AS) and Advanced (A) Level examinations. It is ranked the top secondary school in Botswana and offers rigorous preparation for the Cambridge IGCSE, AS and A-Level examinations. Students from Maru-a-pula have received the Cambridge “Top in the World” awards for their outstanding performance in IGCSE and A-Level exams with 64 graduates currently studying at the world’s top 100 ranked universities

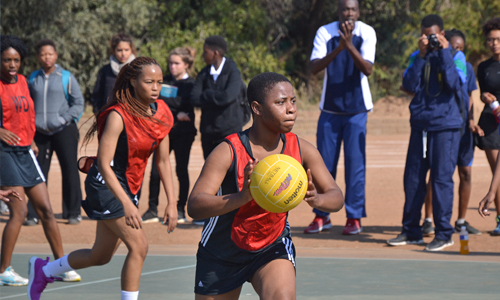
MaP's U19 Netball Team

== Notable alumni ==
Mokgweetsi Masisi - Former President Of Botswana
