= Rainbow High School =

Location
- Gaborone, Botswana; Botswana; 24°39′29″S 25°54′44″E

Information
- Other names: Rainbow
- Type: Private
- Established: 1998
- Locale: Urban
- Colors: Black, Grey, Blue and White
- Website: www.rainbowschool.ac.bw

Rainbow High School is a private, co-educational, inter-denominational school located in Gaborone, Botswana that opened in 1998. The school comprises a primary school, middle school, and a high school.

== History ==
The school began as a primary school in 1997 with one form, and then in 1998 it opened a high school. The school initially had capacity for 75 students and had only seven teachers. The school now has more than 600 students and more than 50 staff.

== Haircut controversy ==
In 2017, the school caused controversy by sending a memo to parents of black students informing them that afro haircuts would not be allowed. The school reversed the decision after an intervention by actor Donald Molosi.
