= Mogoditshane Senior Secondary School =

- Gaborone, Mogoditshane; Botswana

Information
- Type: Government school
- Grades: Form 4 (Grade 11), Form 5 (Grade 12)
- Gender: Co-educational
- Nickname: Sgadishu

Mogoditshane Senior Secondary School is a government Institution located in Mogoditshane, Kweneng, Botswana. The School is not far from Nkoyaphiri hill.
