= St Joseph's College, Kgale =

Government-aided mission school in Botswana

St. Joseph's College
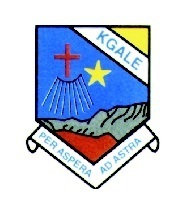

Location
- Gaborone; Botswana
- 24.7144861°S 25.8707535°E

Information
- Type: Government-aided mission school
- Motto: Per Aspera Ad Astra (Through Difficulties to the Stars)
- Religious affiliation: Roman Catholic
- Established: 1928 (98 years ago)
- Sister school: Mater Spei College
- Principal: Ms C. Male
- Chaplain: Father Lawrence
- Grades: Form 4 (Grade 11), Form 5 (Grade 12)
- Gender: Co-educational
- Enrolment: 892(Form 4), 856(Form 5)
- Houses: 5
- Colours: Royal blue, Sky blue & Grey
- Nickname: St. Joe
- National ranking: 1
- Yearbook: Kgalian

St. Joseph's College is a government-aided Catholic school located in Gaborone, Botswana.

Founded in 1928 by the Catholic Church, St. Joseph's College aims to provide education for Batswana children. As a government-aided mission school, its funding is provided by the government of Botswana, while ownership and management fall under the Roman Catholic Diocese of Gaborone.

The college adheres to the national curriculum set forth by the Botswana Ministry of Education and Skills Development. Upon completing their academic program, students undertake the Botswana General Certificate of Secondary Education (BGCSE) terminal examination.

St. Joseph's College, Kgale, is recognized as a government senior school known for fostering disciplined student behavior. The school has earned a reputation for commendable performance in National Examinations.

== Motto ==
The school's motto is Per Aspera Ad Astra. The phrase Ad astra is derived from the Latin language and translates to "to the stars," while per aspera is another Latin phrase signifying "through difficulties" or "through hardships."

== St Joseph's Mission Clinic ==
St. Joseph's College operates a dedicated clinic that provides medical services to its students. The clinic is staffed by qualified medical personnel, including nurses and medical practitioners. Additionally, the clinic extends its services to members of the public who are aware of its presence. The medical staff includes trained nurses and qualified practitioners, some of whom are nuns.

== School identity ==
=== Colour(s) ===
Royal blue, Sky blue & Grey

=== Houses ===
House	Colour	Head of House
Cheetah		Mr. Keolopa
Eagle		Mrs. Chilume
Flamingo		Mr. Wamondila
Impala		Mrs. Galeitsiwe
Zebra		Mrs. Morolong

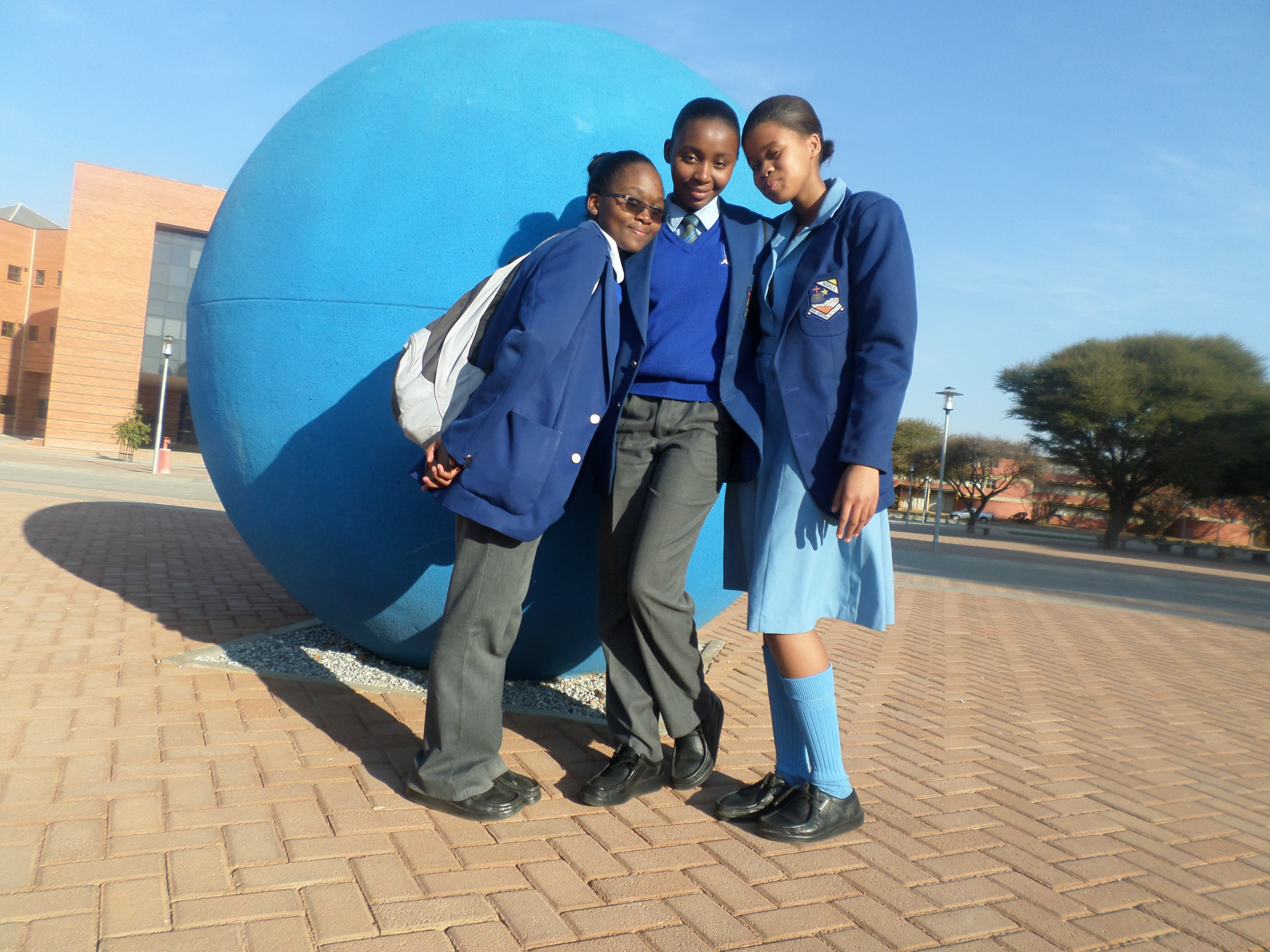
St. Joseph's College students attending a Botswana Student Network Summit at the University of Botswana

=== Boys' uniform ===
- Royal-blue jersey with school logo
- Kgale-blue shirt with logo
- St Joseph's College blazer
- Tie with school logo
- Grey trousers
- Grey or black socks
- Black leather flat-heeled school shoes

=== Girls' uniform ===
- Kgale-blue dress with school logos
- Kgale-blue socks
- Royal-blue jersey with school logo
- St Joseph's College blazer
- Tie with school logo
- Black leather flat-heeled school shoes

== Co-curricular activities ==
- Athletics
- Badminton
- Basketball
- Chess
- Football
- Karate
- Table Tennis
- Tennis

== Performance ==
Year	Position	Percentage	Change
2018	1	47.1%	▼6.31%
2017	1	53.41%	▼6.89%
2016	1	60.3%	▲9.01%
2015	1	51.29%	▲12.95%
2014	1	38.34%	▼ -2.72%
2013	1	41.06%	N/A
2012	1	N/A	N/A

== See also ==
- Education in Botswana
- List of secondary schools in Botswana
- Saint Joseph
