= Botswana Accountancy College =

Tertiary IT and Accounting business school in Botswana

Coordinates: 24°40′49.26″S 025°55′34.4″E

- Motto: Dare to Explore
- Type: Public
- Established: 1996
- Chancellor: Serty Leburu
- Administrative staff: 61 fulltime 11 part-time
- Students: +2,500
- Location: Gaborone, Francistown, Botswana
- Campus: Urban
- Website: www.bac.ac.bw

The Botswana Accountancy College, also known as BAC, is a business school which is headquartered in the city of Gaborone, Botswana. Initially funded and established through a joint venture between the Ministry of Finance and Development Planning and Debswana, the college caters for the accountancy and information technology tertiary needs of the country. The Botswana Accountancy College asserts itself as the center of excellence in Southern Africa and beyond. It specializes in areas of accounting, finance, business, management, hospitality, taxation, leisure, and ICT. BAC has two campuses; the main campus is in Gaborone, and the other in Francistown. The Gaborone Campus is located in the Fairgrounds Office Park of south-east Gaborone.

The college has collaborations with the University of Derby, the University of Sunderland and Sheffield Hallam University in England.

== History ==
The college was established in 1996 as a joint venture between the Ministry of Finance and Development Planning (MFDP), the Debswana Diamond Company, and the Botswana Institute of Accountants, enrolling about 349 ACCA, CIMA, AAT and NCC diploma students. Botswana Accountancy College also offers undergraduate programs that are accredited by the University of Derby. The objectives of the college were to reduce the reliance on expatriate accountants and, in the long term, to be a self-funding project. BAC is a company limited by guarantee with three sponsors as the shareholders. The MFDP and Debswana funded BAC until 2007. The Gaborone Campus is located in the Fairgrounds Office Park of south-east Gaborone.

== Facilities ==
Within Gaborone, BAC operates from three closely linked campuses:

- Main Campus
- BIFM (Fairgrounds Office Park Block D building) 2nd Floor across the road from the main campus
- Fairgrounds Financial Centre, located within the Fairgrounds location

=== Accommodation ===
BAC can accommodate 112 residential students at the main campus in Gaborone. There are three residential blocks to accommodate students, named after Botswana's revolutionary leaders; Khama, Bathoen I, and Sechele.

== Francistown Digital City (FDC) ==
The Francistown Digital City (FDC) is a technology and innovation initiative established under Botswana Accountancy College's Francistown Campus, aimed at strengthening student industry exposure through practical outsourcing projects, digital innovation, and partnerships with private and public sector stakeholders. The initiative focuses on improving student employability by linking academic learning with real-world technology challenges.

The FDC initiative is led by Rebaone Mlalazi, a Computer Science lecturer at Botswana Accountancy College, who serves as the coordinator and spearheads stakeholder engagement, student project management, and strategic partnerships. Under the initiative, BAC Francistown has collaborated with various organizations to support student attachment programmes, hackathons, digital skills training, and software development projects.

== Student life ==
BAC offers extracurricular societies and clubs to students:

- The Business Hive was founded in August 2011. It is an entrepreneurship and finance fraternity to allow students to sample the corporate world during their tenure at BAC through workshops, training, and competitions with Botswana entrepreneurs, mentors, and finance professionals.
- The Debate Society was founded in January 2011. The students have represented BAC across Southern Africa in debating tournaments, as well as in Berlin, Germany for the World Universities Debating Championship.
- BAC Rugby team

== Stakeholders ==
Stakeholders in BAC include:

- The Ministry of Finance
- The Ministry of Education
- Debswana
- Botswana Institute of Chartered Accountants
- Tertiary Education Council
- Regulator
- Management

== Partners ==
- The University of Derby
- The University of Sunderland
- The Botswana Unified Revenue Service
- The Insurance Institute of South Africa
- Sheffield Hallam University
