= Ministry of Education and Skills Development =

Government ministry of Botswana

Ministry overview
- Jurisdiction: Botswana

The Ministry of Education and Skills Development is a government ministry of Botswana. Its offices are in Gaborone. The Ministry of Tertiary Education, Research Science and Technology exists to provide and build knowledge and innovation through the development and implementation of policy on Tertiary Education, Research, Science and Technology to transform Botswana in to a knowledge based society through effective stakeholder collaboration

== History ==
The Ministry was established in October 2016.

== Departments ==
- Corporate Services.
- Radiation Protection Inspectorate.
- Licensing and Inspections
- Instrumentation and Standards Division
- Environmental Monitoring and Nuclear Waste Management
- National Dosimetry Laboratory
- Student Placement
- Research, Science and Technology.
- Tertiary Education Financing.
- Teacher Training and Technical Education.
- Botswana National Commission for UNESCO.

== Parastatals ==
- Botswana Accountancy College (BAC).
- Botswana Open University (BOU).
- Botswana Innovation Hub. (BIH).
- Botswana Institute for Technology, Research and Innovation (BITRI).
- Botswana International University of Science and Technology (BIUST).
- Botswana Qualifications Authority (BQA).
- Human Resource Council (HRDC).
- University of Botswana (UB).

== Institutions ==
College of Education:

- Molepolole College of Education.
- Serowe College of Education.
- Tlokweng College of Education.
- Tonota College of Education.

Technical Colleges:

- Botswana College of Engineering and Technology.
- Gaborone Technical College.
- Jwaneng Technical College.
- Maun Technical College.
- Oodi College of Applied Arts and Technology.
- Palapye Technical College.
- Selebi Phikwe Technical College.
- Francistown College of Technical and Vocational Education.

== See also ==
- Education in Botswana
