= Francistown =

- City
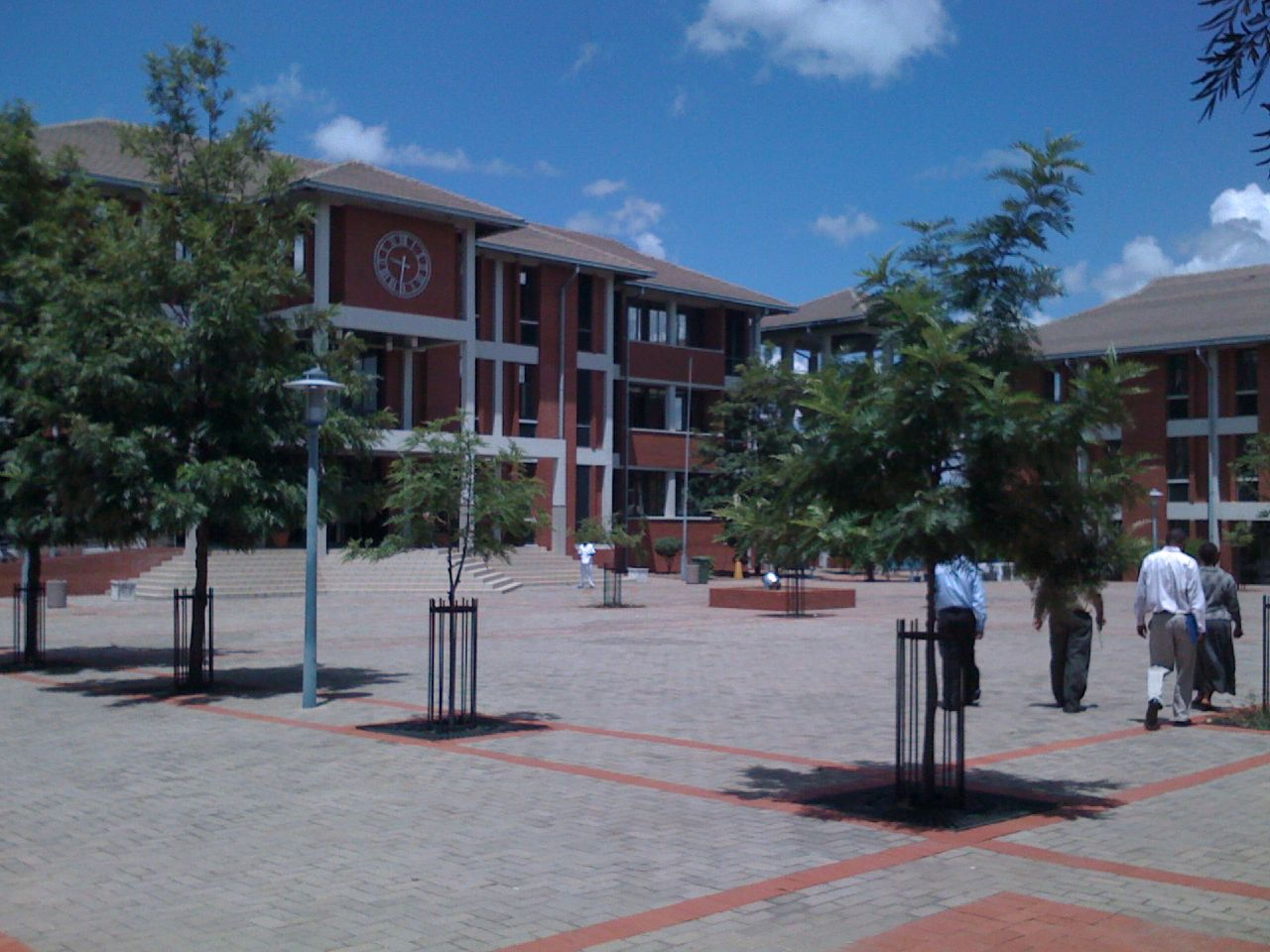
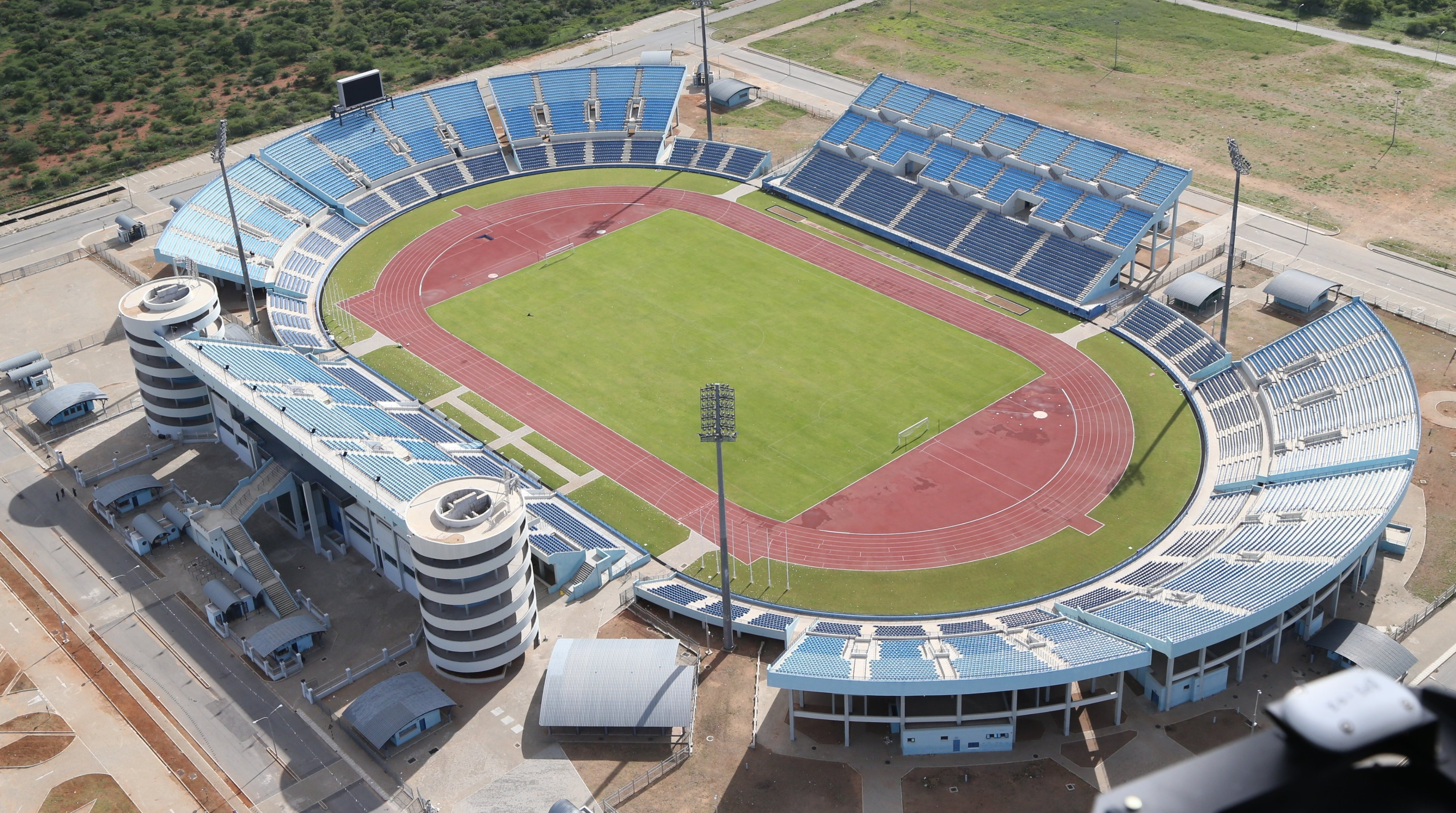
- Top to bottom: Institute of Health Sciences in Francistown CBD, Phillip Gaonwe Matante International Airport, Obed Itani Chilume Stadium

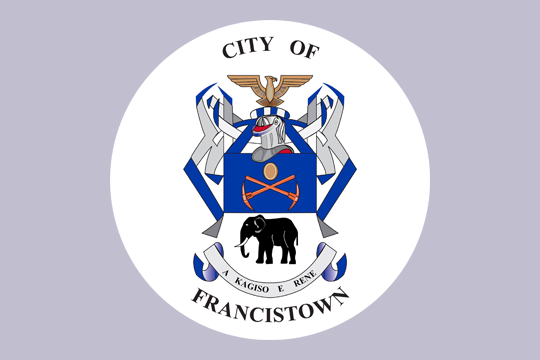
- Flag

- Location within Botswana
- Coordinates: 21°10′25″S 27°30′45″E
- Country: Botswana
- Founded: 1897
- Incorporated as a city: 1997
- Named for: Daniel Francis

Government
  - Type: City commission government
  - Body: City of Francistown Council
  - Mayor: Godisang Radisigo (BDP)

Area
  - City: 79 km^{2} (31 sq mi)
- Elevation: 1,001 m (3,284 ft)

Population (2022 census)
  - City: 103,417
  - Density: 1,300/km^{2} (3,400/sq mi)
  - Metro: 147,122
- Time zone: UTC+02:00 (CAT)
- Geographical area code: 2XX
- ISO 3166 code: BW-FR
- Climate: BSh

Francistown is the second-largest city in Botswana, with a population of about 103,417 inhabitants and 147,122 inhabitants in its agglomeration at the 2022 census. It is located in eastern Botswana, about 400 kilometres (250 mi) north-northeast from the capital, Gaborone. Francistown is located at the confluence of the Tati and Ntshe rivers, and near the Shashe River (tributary to the Limpopo) and 90 kilometres (56 mi) from the international border with Zimbabwe.

Francistown was the centre of Southern Africa's first gold rush and is still surrounded by old and abandoned mines. The City of Francistown is an administrative district, separated from North-East District. It is administered by Francistown City Council. The main language spoken and used in and around Francistown is Kalanga. Other languages used in the area are isiNdebele, ChiShona as well as SeTswana. Francistown is the only city in Botswana with an English name. There are no English-language named towns and only a couple of villages with English names.

== History ==
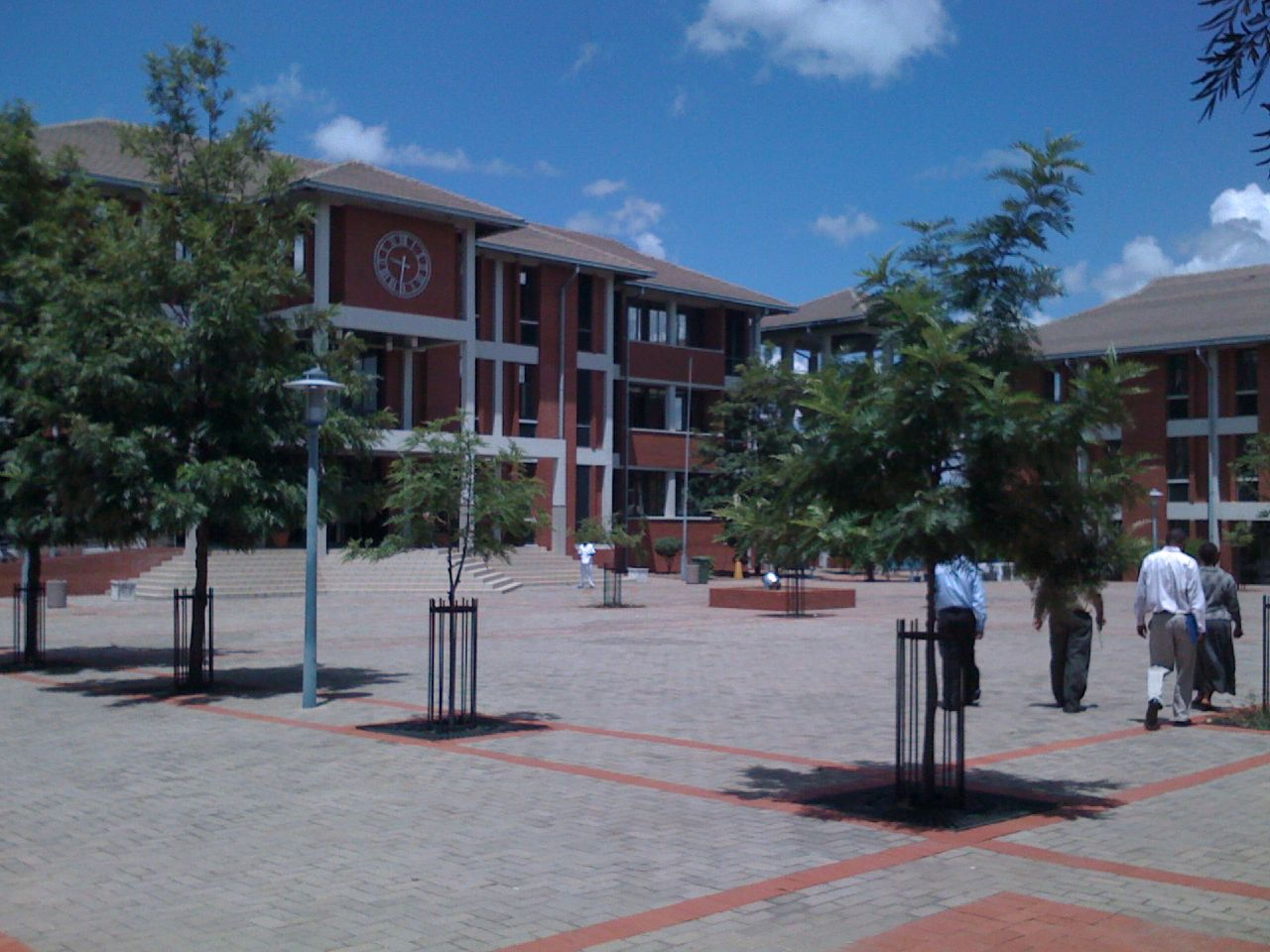

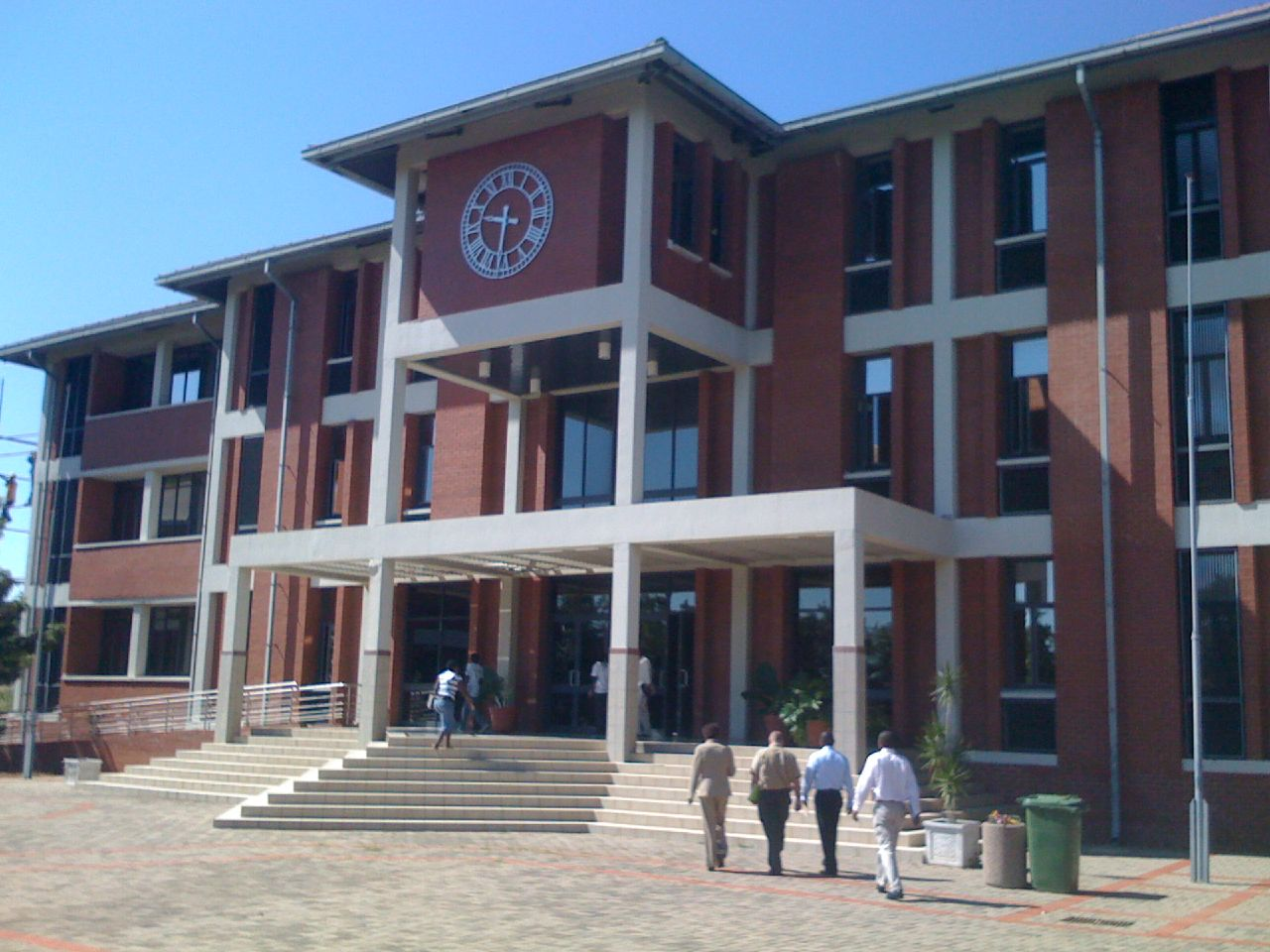
The main square in Francistown.

Although evidence of habitation by humans goes back around 10,000 years, written evidence is more recent. Historical evidence shows that Francistown started off as one of the villages of the BaKalanga people. Nyangabgwe was the nearest village to Francistown to have been visited by Europeans, when it was visited by the missionary, Robert Moffat. Moffat was followed in 1867 by a gold prospector, Karl Mauch who found the Bakalanga mining gold along the Tati River, and publicised the Tati Goldfields starting the first Southern Africa goldrush.

The present town was founded in 1897 as a settlement near the Monarch mine and named after Daniel Francis, an English prospector from Liverpool who acquired prospecting licences in the region in 1869. Francis was a director of the Tati Concessions Land (Tati Concessions Company), which acquired the land from King Lobengula. The centre of the new town was formed when the company sold off 300 lots in August of that year. The Monarch mine was not the only mine in operation at that time, and it was widely believed that Francistown would grow rapidly. In the beginning, the town comprised one street east of, and parallel to the railway line. This street featured several companies, including two hotels (the Grand and the Tati), retail and wholesale shops, and three banks.

Prior to independence Francistown was Botswana's largest commercial centre. In 1897, the company sold part of the land for residential and commercial purposes. The city started as a gold mining town, and gold sustained the area's economy from the late 1800s until the 1930s. When gold was discovered nearby in 1869 it sparked the first gold rush in Africa fifteen years before the gold boom at Witwatersrand in South Africa. The industry was hard hit by the global recession of the 1930s. Between 1936 and 1980s, the economy of Francistown was largely supported or dependent on the Witwatersrand Native Labour Association, a company that recruited labour for South African mines. The miners were recruited from many African countries, and transported to South Africa through Francistown by air or railway.

Haskins Street (named after a prominent family in the town prior to independence) was the first tarred road in Botswana. Since 1966, the city has grown significantly due mainly to active cross-border trading with Rhodesia/Zimbabwe. In 1997, Francistown became a city, Botswana's 2nd after Gaborone. With the city located astride Botswana's main road and rail transport routes, mining, commerce and agriculture have been essential parts of its economy. Tati Nickel, The Dumela Industrial Complex and Botswana Meat Commission are the main economic drivers in the city. Both government departments and private benefit the local economy.

== Economy ==
=== Mining ===
Francistown is located on Botswana's main air and road transport routes; mining and agriculture are important. Principal mining companies include Tati Nickel, owned by Norilsk Nickel, which has operations at the Selkirk and Phoenix mines, producing principally cobalt, copper and nickel. The Dumela Industrial Complex, an industrial park, is an important employer; the Botswana Metal Refinery was being built in 2008 near the city. However, the project was halted due to high costs.

=== Media ===
The city's media fraternity is still in its infancy. The media includes Botswana's The Voice newspaper, which was founded in 1993. This is a very popular tabloid newspaper that had also spread its wings to the capital city, Gaborone.

== Climate ==
Francistown features a hot semi-arid climate, with warm to hot summers and mild winters. The city on averages sees 460 millimetres (18 in) of precipitation annually. The city features a short wet season that spans from December through March and a lengthy dry season that covers the remaining eight months. Francistown receives on average only 3 millimetres (0.12 in) of precipitation at the peak of its dry season (from June through August), which is also when it experiences its chilliest temperatures. Average low temperatures routinely fall below 8 °C (46 °F) during the aforementioned months. The record high temperature registered in Francistown was 41.1 °C (106.0 °F) and the lowest temperature recorded was −6.5 °C (20.3 °F).

Climate data for Francistown (1991–2020, extremes 1922-present)
Month	Jan	Feb	Mar	Apr	May	Jun	Jul	Aug	Sep	Oct	Nov	Dec	Year
Record high °C (°F)	41.5 (106.7)	41.0 (105.8)	39.0 (102.2)	38.0 (100.4)	35.2 (95.4)	31.5 (88.7)	35.0 (95.0)	36.6 (97.9)	39.4 (102.9)	45.6 (114.1)	41.0 (105.8)	40.2 (104.4)	45.6 (114.1)
Mean daily maximum °C (°F)	31.5 (88.7)	31.2 (88.2)	30.4 (86.7)	29.0 (84.2)	27.0 (80.6)	24.6 (76.3)	24.1 (75.4)	27.7 (81.9)	31.2 (88.2)	33.1 (91.6)	32.9 (91.2)	31.7 (89.1)	29.5 (85.1)
Daily mean °C (°F)	25.4 (77.7)	25.0 (77.0)	23.9 (75.0)	21.4 (70.5)	17.8 (64.0)	15.1 (59.2)	14.7 (58.5)	18.0 (64.4)	22.1 (71.8)	25.1 (77.2)	25.8 (78.4)	25.4 (77.7)	21.6 (70.9)
Mean daily minimum °C (°F)	19.3 (66.7)	18.8 (65.8)	17.4 (63.3)	13.7 (56.7)	8.5 (47.3)	5.5 (41.9)	5.2 (41.4)	8.4 (47.1)	13.0 (55.4)	17.2 (63.0)	18.8 (65.8)	19.2 (66.6)	13.7 (56.7)
Record low °C (°F)	8.6 (47.5)	8.5 (47.3)	6.6 (43.9)	2.5 (36.5)	−4.0 (24.8)	−5.4 (22.3)	−5.0 (23.0)	−5.5 (22.1)	0.0 (32.0)	5.0 (41.0)	4.1 (39.4)	8.8 (47.8)	−5.5 (22.1)
Average precipitation mm (inches)	88.9 (3.50)	61.9 (2.44)	48.4 (1.91)	15.8 (0.62)	3.8 (0.15)	7.9 (0.31)	1.3 (0.05)	2.1 (0.08)	2.5 (0.10)	16.8 (0.66)	70.7 (2.78)	83.0 (3.27)	382.8 (15.07)
Average rainy days (≥ 10 mm)	4	3	1	1	0	0	0	0	0	1	3	3	16
Source 1: Météo Climat
Source 2: World Meteorological Organization (rain days 1971-2000)

== Demographics ==
Ever since the founding of Francistown as a gold mining and railway centre in the nineteenth century, the city's population has consistently shown a steady increase. Francistown is Botswana's second largest city with 22.7% of the country's urban population in 1991. The growth of Selebi-Phikwe, Orapa and Jwaneng since 1971, together with the very rapid growth of Gaborone, has reduced Francistown's share of the total urban population from a figure of 34.7% in 1971. In the same period (1971-1991), the country's urban population grew by 427.2% from 54,411 to a population of 287,063.

The Bakalanga, the second largest ethnic group in Botswana are traditionally centred around the town and the surrounding area. Recently, the city has seen a large influx of illegal immigrants from neighbouring Zimbabwe.

Year	Population	% change
1964	9,521	0
1971	18,612	+95
1981	31,065	+65
1991	38,524	+29
2001	84,406	+110
2011	100,079	+19
2022	103,417	+3

== Culture ==
Francistown is home to the Supa Ngwao Museum, with exhibits related to the area's history and heritage. The museum, which receives most of its funds from the government, is currently going through refurbishment as of October 2011. A new nature reserve, Tachila, has been established 5 kilometres (3.1 mi) from central Francistown on an old Tati Company Farm, Lady Mary. The nature reserve is expected to be a tourism turn-over for the already flourishing city with its variety of wild animals.

== Places of worship ==
Among the places of worship, they are predominantly Christian churches and temples : Evangelical Lutheran Church in Botswana (Lutheran World Federation), Assemblies of God, the Church of Jesus Christ of Latter-day Saints, International Pentecostal Holiness Church, Christ Embassy, Roman Catholic Diocese of Francistown (Catholic Church).

== Education ==
The city has primary schools on almost all its townships, most if not all of which are run by the city council. Notable amongst these are Ikhutseng Primary School, Tati Town Primary School and Nyangabgwe Primary School, which are one of the oldest in the city. There is also Aerodrome Primary School. The government also has junior high schools, trading as "secondary schools". Most of these were started as partnerships between government and society. It was only recently that the government took most of these over. Examples of these include Setlalekgosi, Montsamaisa and Selepa Junior Secondary Schools. These offer the best education at JC level and have a three-year course.

There are private schools in the city as well, among others the historic and famous John Mackenzie School, which offers primary, junior secondary as well as senior secondary education. The school also offers O-Levels for students who have pursued the IGCS Examination. There is also Mophato English Medium School, TKM, Clifton Preparatory School and many more other smaller private schools.

There are currently two senior secondary schools in Francistown, being Mater Spei College, partly ran by the Roman Catholic Church and Francistown Senior Secondary School, opened in 1978 and currently enrolling 1200 students. Located in the history-rich township of Aerodrome, it is one of the largest institutions in the city. The Francistown Teacher Training College became one of the campuses of the University of Botswana in 1973.

The Francistown College of Technical and Vocational Education was officially opened by former president of Botswana Ian Khama on 10 October 2008. The college was built in order to accommodate 1,500 learners on technical and vocational courses and teacher-training programmes. The college buildings are situated amongst a 4-hectare (9.9-acre) area in the suburbs of Gerald Estates. The city also hosts the Institute of Health Sciences, which is located near the Nyangabwe Referral Hospital. The institution, amongst others, offers courses in nursing and health care.

== Transport and infrastructure ==
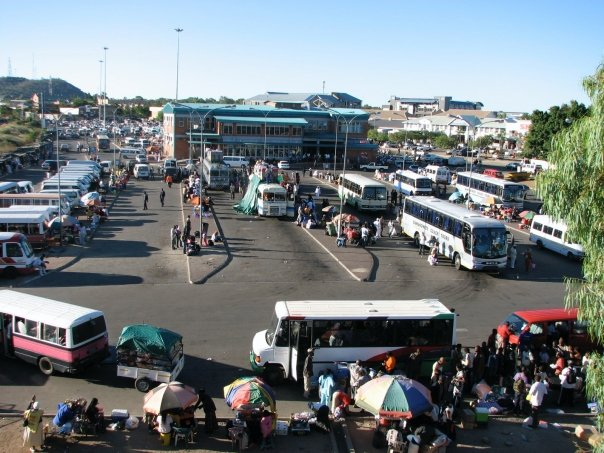
Francistown Bus Terminal

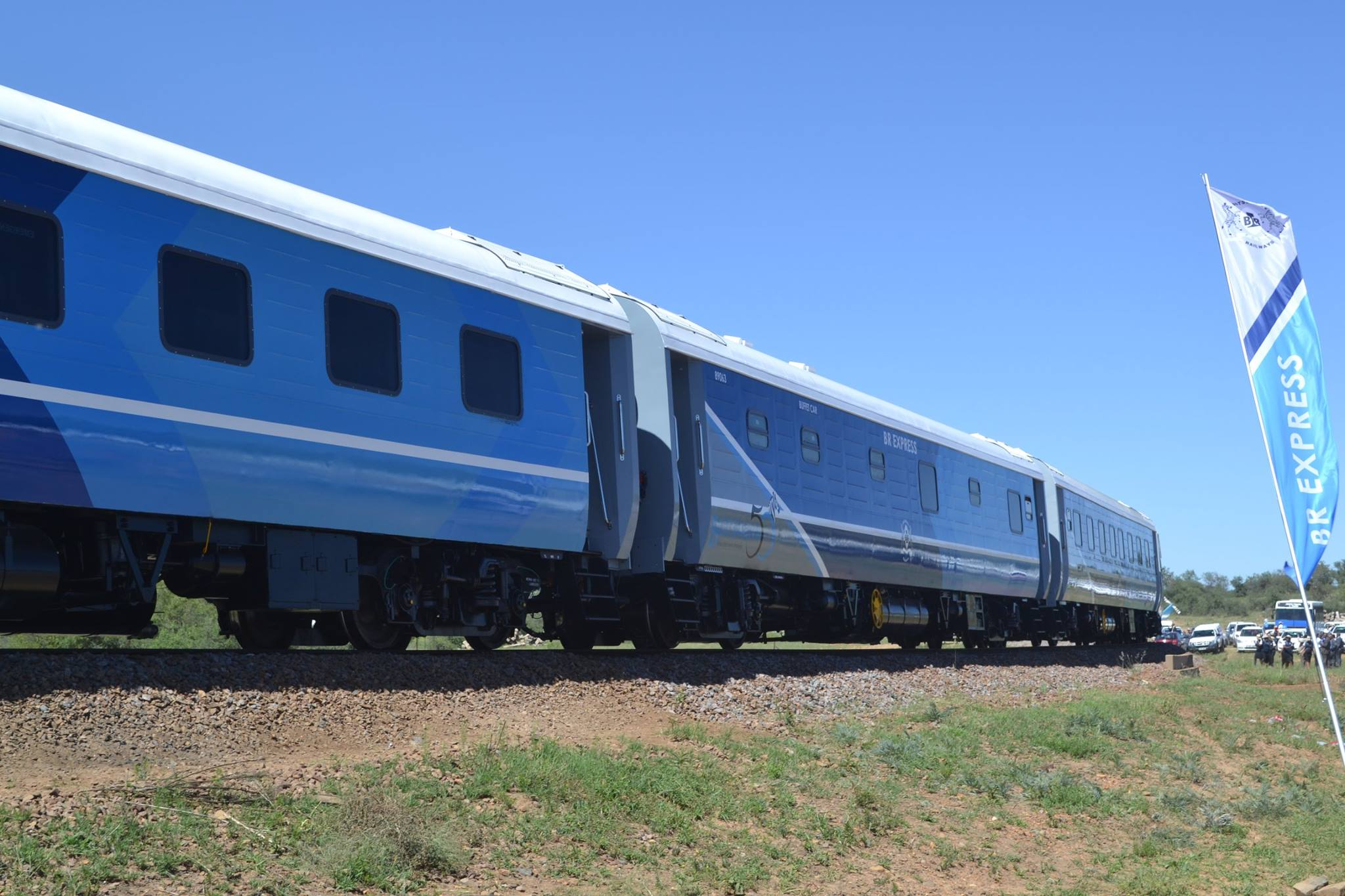
BR Express, the passenger train

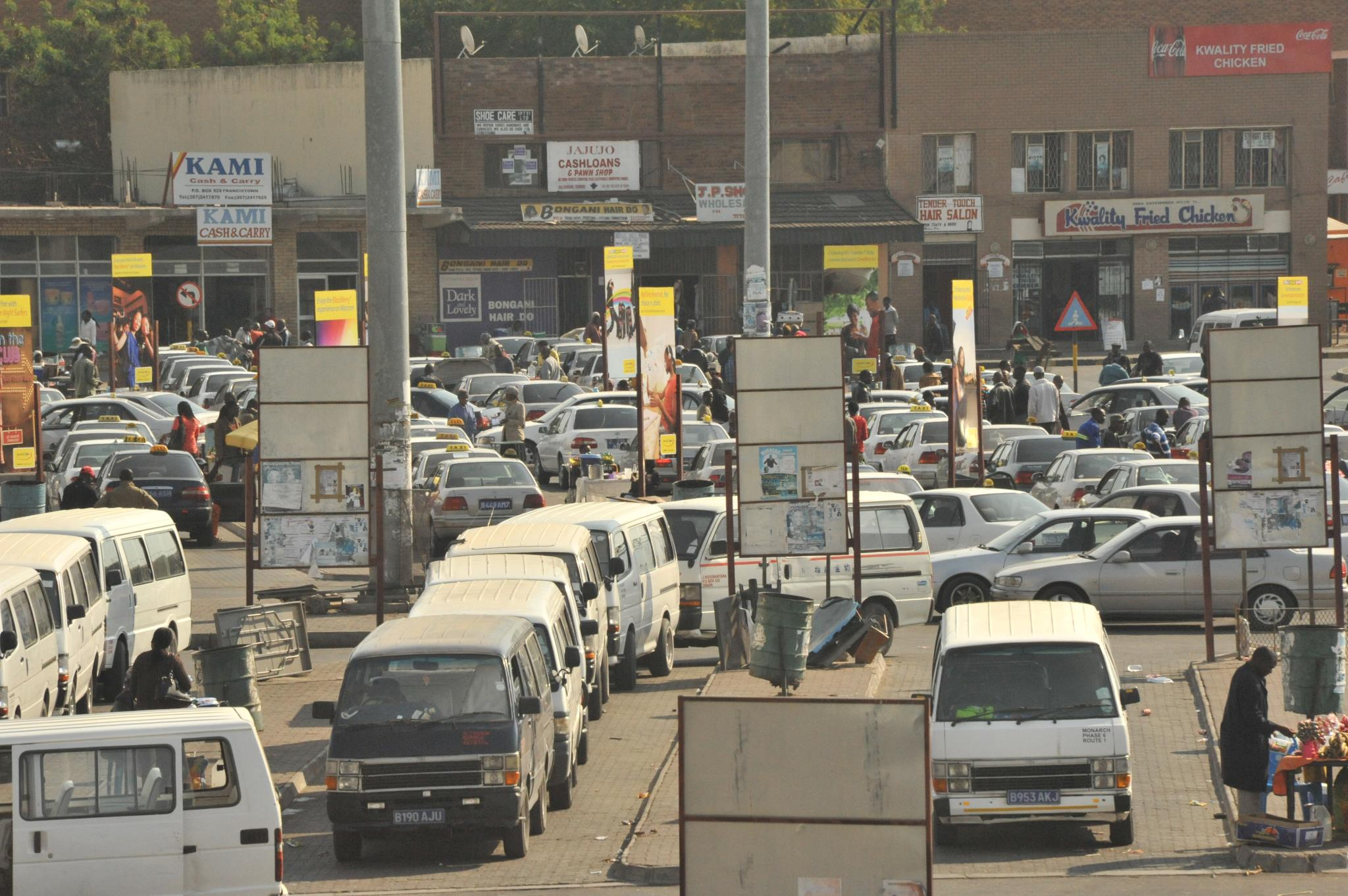
Francistown City Bus and Taxi Rank

The city is a major transport hub. A railway line links the city with Harare in Zimbabwe via Bulawayo. The same line links Francistown with the capital city Gaborone and Lobatse in the south. Surfaced roads link the city to Ramokgwebana in the north, and to Kazungula as well as Kasane via Nata.

The city is served by Francistown International Airport, which was opened on 9 September 2011 after being built at a cost of P596 million, officially opened by Minister of Transport, Frank Ramsden. With a terminal building designated for traffic forecast of up to 2025, it has a larger capacity and has replaced the old airport, which is now used by the Botswana Defence Force's Air Arm.

== Sports ==
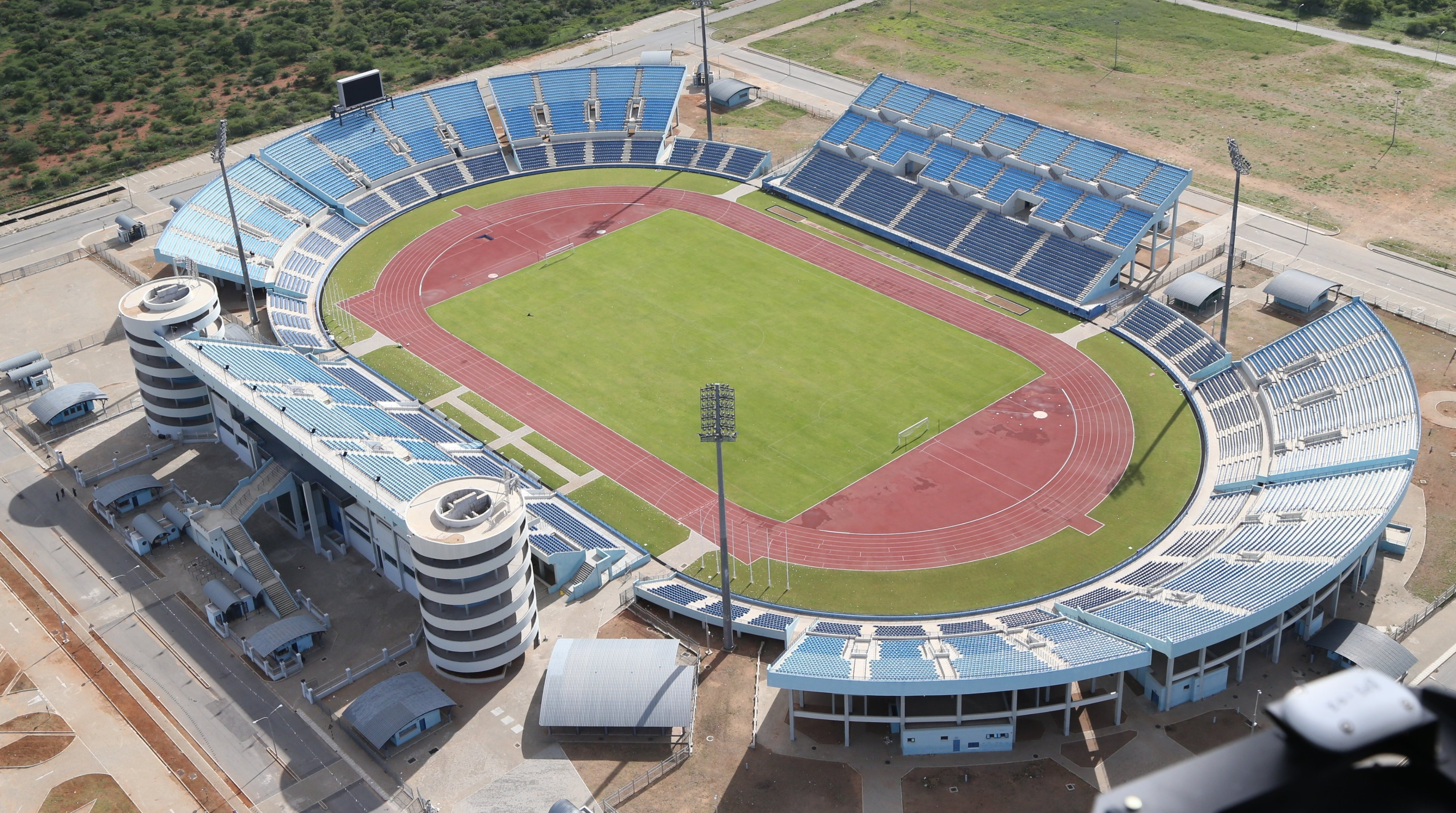
Francistown Stadium

Based at the Francistown Club, the Francistown School of Tennis is a professional tennis centre dedicated to developing young children (starting at 4 years old) into international tennis players.

Francistown also hosts several football clubs. These include TAFIC Sporting Club, TASC FC (Tati Sporting Club), ECCO City Green, Great North Tigers FC (GNT) and others.

All the teams have played in the country's highest league, Botswana Premier League. GNT was recently promoted to the Premier League, while TAFIC play in the lower division. The new Francistown Stadium is still under construction, and will be complete soon. The stadium will be the largest in the northern part of Botswana, with a capacity of 27,000 spectators, and will be home ground to some of the above teams. Other stadiums in the city include the Francistown City Council's Area S stadium.

== Twin towns – sister cities ==
Francistown is twinned with:

- Genk, Belgium
- Tai'an, China

== See also ==
- James G. Haskins
- Lepashe River
- Mathangwane Village
