= List of power stations in Botswana =

This article lists power stations in Botswana. This list is incomplete. You can help.

== Thermal ==
Thermal power station	Community	Coordinates	Fuel type	Capacity	Completed (or completion expected)	Owner	Notes
Morupule A Power Station	Palapye	22°31′12″S 27°02′12″E	Coal	132 MW	1989	Botswana Power Corporation	
Morupule B Power Station	Palapye	22°31′20.5″S 27°02′58.2″E	Coal	600 MW	2014	Botswana Power Corporation	
Orapa Power Station	Orapa	21°19′06″S 25°25′03″E	Dual (diesel or natural gas)	90 MW	2011	Botswana Power Corporation	Peaking power plant
Phakalane Power Station	Phakalane	24°34′25″S 25°58′07″E	N/A (photovoltaic)	1.3 MW	2012	Botswana Power Corporation	Pilot power plant

== Solar ==
=== PV solar ===
Solar power station	Community	Coordinates	Fuel type	Capacity (megawatts)	Year completed	Owner	Notes
Mmadinare Solar Power Station	Central District	21°51′43″S 27°41′55″E	Solar	120	2027 (expected)	Scatec	
Selebi-Phikwe Solar Power Station	Central District	21°57′19″S 27°52′46″E	Solar	50	2025 (expected)	Scatec	
Tati Solar Power Station	Francistown	21°31′12″S 27°48′16″E	Solar	100	2024 (expected)	Tati Solar Company (SPV)	
Palapye Solar Power Station	Palapye	22°29′23″S 27°00′46″E	Solar	100	2026 (expected)	Palapye Solar Consortium (SPV)	
Jwaneng Solar Power Station	Jwaneng	24°38′35″S 24°39′55″E	Solar	100	2025 (expected)	Sinotswana Green Energy (SPV)	

=== Concentrated solar ===
Solar power station	Community	Coordinates	Fuel type	Capacity (megawatts)	Year completed	Owner	Notes
Maun Concentrated Solar Power Station	Ngamiland	20°02′14″S 23°24′22″E	Concentrated solar power	100	2027 (expected)	TBD	
Letlhakane Concentrated Solar Power Station	Central District	20°02′14″S 23°24′22″E	Concentrated solar power	100	2027 (expected)	TBD	

== See also ==
- List of power stations in Africa
- List of largest power stations in the world
