= Palapye Solar Power Station =

Solar farm in Botswana

- Official name: Lotsane Solar Power Station
- Country: Botswana
- Location: Palapye, Central District
- Coordinates: 22°29′23″S 27°00′46″E
- Status: Proposed
- Construction began: H1 2025 Expected
- Commission date: H2 2026 Expected
- Owner: Palapye Solar Consortium
- Operator: Palapye Solar Consortium

Solar farm
- Type: Flat-panel PV

Power generation
- Nameplate capacity: 100 MW

The Palapye Solar Power Station, also Lotsane Solar Power Station, is a 100 MW (130,000 hp) solar power station, under development in Botswana. The solar farm is owned and is being developed by Solarcentury from the United Kingdom and ENRC from Botswana. The power generated here is intended to be fed into the Southern Africa Power Pool for export. As of February 2024 the development has received a power generation license from the Botswana Energy Regulatory Authority (BERA).

== Location ==
The power station is located in the town of Palapye, in the Central District of Botswana. The solar farm lies adjacent to the Morupule Coal Mine. Palapye is located approximately 273 kilometres (170 mi) northeast of Gaborone, the capital city of Botswana.

== Overview ==
Solarcentury Africa of the United Kingdom, has partnered with Botswana's Energy & National Resource Corporation (ENRC) to jointly develop this solar farm. As of February 2024, the developers have obtained an electricity generation license from BERA and a grid impact assessment from the Botswana Power Corporation (BPC). It is expected that the project will reach financial close in 2024.

== Developers ==
The power station is under development by a consortium comprising Solarcentury, a British company and Energy & National Resource Corporation (ENRC), a Botswana entity. It is expected that the developer/owners will form a special purpose vehicle (SPV) company to own, finance, build, operate and maintain this power station. For descriptive purposes, we will refer to the SPV as Palapye Solar Consortium.

== Construction timetable ==
If and when financial close is achieved in 2024 as anticipated, it is expected that construction will begin in Q1 2025.

== Other considerations ==
Solarcentury is a member of the SAPP since 2023. The IPP is concurrently developing a 60 MW solar project in Namibia, also for sale to the Southern Africa Power Pool. These two projects are intended promote the growth of electricity trade within the Southern African Development Community (SADC).

== See also ==
- List of power stations in Botswana
