= Bujagali =

Bujagali may refer to:

- Bujagali Falls, waterfalls on the Victoria Nile that were submerged in 2011 when Bujagali Power Station was built
- Bujagali Hydroelectric Power Station, 250 megawatt hydro power plant, the largest power station in Uganda between 2012 and 2018
- Bujagali Energy Limited, Special Purpose Vehicle company that owns and operates Bujagali Power Station
