= Bujagali Hydroelectric Power Station =

Power station in Uganda

Bujagali Dam
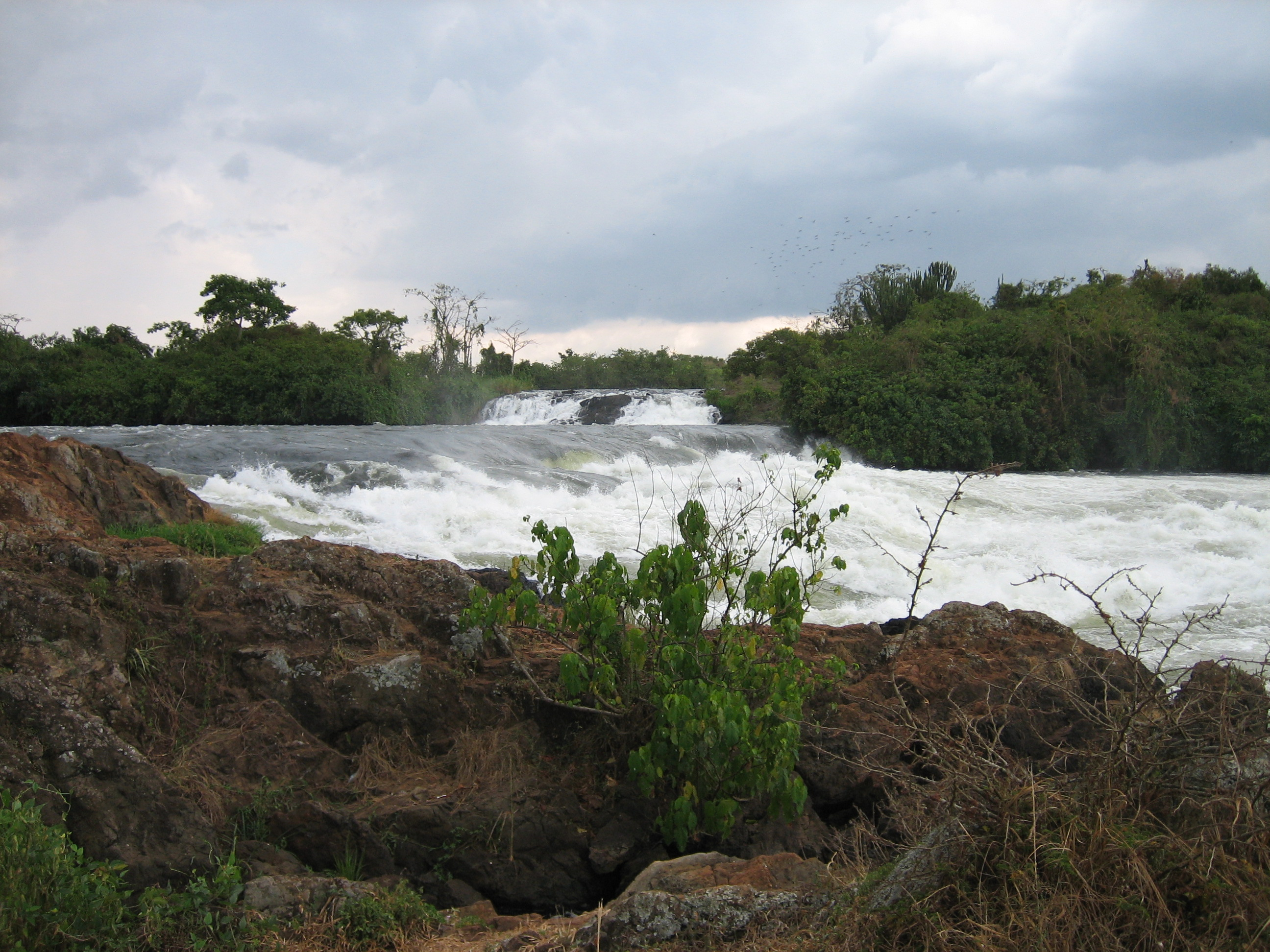
- River Nile, 5 km (3 mi) downstream of Bujagali Dam

- Location of Bujagali Power Station. Placement on map is approximate. Bujagali Dam (Africa) Bujagali Dam (Earth)
- Location: Bujagali, Uganda
- Coordinates: 00°29′54″N 33°08′15″E
- Construction began: 2007
- Opening date: 2012
- Construction cost: US$862 million

Dam and spillways
- Type of dam: Gravity dam
- Impounds: Victoria Nile

Power Station
- Commission date: 2012
- Turbines: 5
- Installed capacity: 250 MW (340,000 hp)
- Annual generation: 1,100 GWh

The Bujagali Power Station is a hydroelectric power station across the Victoria Nile that harnesses the energy of its namesake, the Bujagali Falls, in Uganda. Construction began in 2007 and concluded in 2012. It was officially inaugurated on 8 October 2012 by Ugandan President Yoweri Museveni and Aga Khan IV in the presence of African politicians and investors.

The 250-megawatt power station was the largest hydroelectric energy source in Uganda when it was commissioned. However, the planned Karuma and Ayago power stations would be larger. The funding for the station was a source of some concern, as investors joined and departed from the project. As of July 2014, the plant was managed by Bujagali Energy Limited, which selected Italian contractor Salini Impregilo to develop the project.

== Location ==
The power station lies across the Victoria Nile, about 15.5 kilometres (10 mi) north-west of the central business district of the city of Jinja and immediately north of the former location of the Bujagali Falls. It is at the border between Buikwe District to the west and Jinja District to the east. The coordinates of Bujagali Power Station are 0° 29'54.00"N, 33° 08' 15.00"E (latitude:0.498325; longitude:33.137500).

== History ==
As far back as 2001, the government of Uganda started to plan the construction of a hydroelectric power plant at Bujagali Falls. The original developers included AES Energy from the United States and the Madhvani Group from Uganda. In the midst of fraud investigations, the first project was abandoned in 2003 when AES Energy pulled out of the deal, citing a protracted process because of objections from environmentalists. The project was delayed due to protracted negotiations between investors and representatives of the Soga cult of the water spirit Budhagaali, whose main shrines were seen as inextricably linked to the strength of the waterfall. Ultimately agreement was reached between the parties.

A new consortium, Bujagali Energy Limited, was created by Sithe Global Power LLC, from the United States, and Industrial Promotion Services, a division of the Aga Khan Fund for Economic Development, and was tasked with developing the project. Construction of the dam and powerhouse started in June 2007. Salini Impregilo was selected to be the lead contractor. The power station began commercial operations on 1 August 2012. At the peak of construction activity, the project employed over 2,500 people, including about 2,200 Ugandan nationals.

== Ownership ==
As of September 2016, the shareholders in Bujagali Energy Limited were as outlined in this reference. In May 2018, the Daily Nation newspaper reported that Jubilee Holdings Limited was set to invest an additional KSh4.4 billion (US$44 million) in the business, in addition to the KSh5.5 billion (US$55 million) that it had already invested.

Shareholding in Bujagali Energy Limited in 2016
Rank	Name of owner	Percentage ownership
1	Jubilee Investment Company	
2	Government of Uganda	
3	Sithe Global Power	65.0
4	Industrial Promotion Services	
5	Aga Khan Fund for Economic Development	
	Total	100.0

In mid-2018, SN Power (today Scatec) of Norway acquired the shareholding previously owned by Sithe Global Power of the United States. The acquisition of that shareholding, held through an SPV called SG Bujagali Holdings Limited (SGBH), was completed by 1 August 2018.

The ownership of the power station as of August 2018 is as illustrated in the table below.

Shareholding in Bujagali Energy Limited in 2018
Rank	Name of owner	Percentage ownership
1	Jubilee Investment Company	
2	Government of Uganda	
3	SN Power (today Scatec)	65.0
4	Industrial Promotion Services	
5	Aga Khan Fund for Economic Development	
	Total	100.0

== Construction costs ==
The estimated costs for the dam and power plant was US$800 million. Another $62 million was spent on building a high voltage transmission line from Jinja to Kawanda, near Kampala, a distance of about 80 kilometres (50 mi). Bujagali Energy Limited invested approximately US$190 million of its own money into the project. The rest of the funds were borrowed from the following international lenders:

1. International Finance Corporation (IFC), a member of the World Bank Group
2. African Development Bank
3. European Investment Bank
4. German Investment Corporation
5. KfW
6. PROPARCO of France
7. French Development Agency
8. Netherlands Development Finance Company
9. Absa Group Limited
10. BNP Paribas
11. Nedbank
12. Standard Chartered Bank

In March 2018, the Board of Directors of IFC and MIGA approved plans to refinance in excess of US$400 million in construction debt owed by Bujagali Energy Limited, the project SPV. The approval includes US$423 million in guarantees, in support of the project. The refinancing will extend the tenor of the existing loans made in 2007, by the lenders listed above. This, along with tax waivers from the Ugandan government, will lower the cost of electricity to the consumer and stimulate economic growth in the country, where only 26 percent of the population (8 percent in rural areas) had access to grid-electricity at that time.

== Completion date ==
The project was completed in 2012, although partial power generation started in 2011.

In April 2010, The EastAfrican, a Kenyan weekly publication, indicated that the opening of the dam would be phased, one unit at a time. On 2 February 2012, Ugandan newspapers reported the commissioning of the first turbine of the power station. In May 2012, the third 50-megawatt turbine was commissioned, bringing output to 150 megawatts. On 15 June 2012, Ugandan press reports indicated that the fourth and fifth turbines had come online, bringing total output to 250 megawatts. The plant officially began commercial operation on 1 August 2012.

On 8 October 2012, the project was officially inaugurated by Ugandan President Yoweri Museveni and Aga Khan IV in the presence of African politicians and investors.

== The cost of power ==
As of October 2016, the dam's utilization rate was approximately 70 percent. The power generated cost the end-user about US$0.11/kilowatt-hour, which was the highest rate in the East African Community. In September 2016, the government of Uganda began negotiations with equity partners and lenders to restructure the financing of the dam to reduce the cost to the end-user to about US$0.072/kilowatt-hours.

== See also ==
- List of power stations in Uganda
- Nalubaale Hydroelectric Power Station
