= Selebi-Phikwe Solar Power Station =

Solar farm in Selebi-Phikwe, Central, Botswana

- Country: Botswana
- Location: Selebi-Phikwe, Central District
- Coordinates: 21°57′19″S 27°52′46″E
- Status: Proposed
- Construction began: December 2022
- Commission date: 2024 (expected)
- Owner: Scatec

Solar farm
- Type: Flat-panel PV

Power generation
- Nameplate capacity: 50 MW (67,000 hp)

The Selebi-Phikwe Solar Power Station (Note: Sometimes spelled Selibe-Phikwe Solar Power Station) is a 50 MW (67,000 hp) solar power plant under development in Botswana. It is owned and is being developed by Scatec, the multinational energy conglomerate, whose headquarters are located in Oslo, Norway. The off-taker is Botswana Power Corporation (BPC), under a 25-year power purchase agreement (PPA).

== Location ==
The power station would be located in the town of Selebi-Phikwe, (Note: Sometimes spelled Selibe-Phikwe) in the Central District of Botswana. Selebi-Phikwe is located approximately 175 kilometres (109 mi) northeast of Serowe, the district headquarters. This is approximately 146 kilometres (91 mi) southeast of Francistown, the second-largest city in the country. Selebi-Phikwe is located about 400 kilometres (249 mi) northeast of Gaborone, the national capital and largest city of Botswana.

== Overview ==
The design calls for a ground-mounted solar farm, with capacity generation of 50 megawatts. Its output is to be sold directly to Botswana Power Corporation for integration into the national grid. The power is to be distributed to approximately 20,000 Botswana households. The power station will facilitate the country to forego the emission of 48,000 tonnes of carbon dioxide annually.

== Developers ==
The solar farm is under development by Scatec, the Norwegian renewable energy Independent power producer (IPP). Scatec is also the engineering, procurement and construction (EPC) contractor, asset manager as well as the operations and maintenance (O&M) company.

== Other considerations ==
As of September 2022, Botswana's installed electricity generation capacity was 450 MW. The country imports an additional 150 MW from neighboring South Africa. At that time national demand was estimated at 550 MW. The government of Botswana has plans to increase its installed capacity by developing new solar power stations, thereby achieving energy autonomy from South Africa. This power station is part of those efforts.

== See also ==
- List of power stations in Botswana
