= Mmadinare Solar Power Station =

Solar farm in Botswana

- Country: Botswana
- Location: Mmadinare, Central District
- Coordinates: 21°51′43″S 27°41′55″E
- Status: Under construction
- Construction began: 24 March 2024
- Commission date: December 2025 Expected (Phase I)
- Construction cost: US$104 million
- Owner: Scatec
- Operator: Scatec

Solar farm
- Type: Flat-panel PV

Power generation
- Nameplate capacity: Phase I: 60 MW; Phase II: 60 MW; Total: 120 MW

The Mmadinare Solar Power Station is a 120 MW (160,000 hp) solar power station, under development in Botswana. The solar farm will be developed in two phases of 60 megawatts each. Scatec, the Norwegian independent power producer (IPP) owns the project and Botswana Power Corporation (BPC), the national electricity utility company is the power off-taker, under a 25-year power purchase agreement.

== Location ==
The power station is located in the town of Mmadinare, in the Central District of Botswana. Mmadinare is located approximately 405 kilometres (252 mi) northeast of Gaborone, the capital city of Botswana.

== Developers ==
The power station is under development by Scatec, a Norwegian independent power producer (IPP). Scatec owns the power station 100 percent. Authorization for the first 60 megawatts of this renewable energy project was awarded in August 2022. Another 60 MW (the 2nd phase) was authorized in the third quarter of 2023.

Scatec was also selected as the engineering, procurement and construction (EPC) contractor and as the operations and maintenance (O&M) manager and service provider. The South African division of Scatec will handle the construction and operations of both phases of the power station.

== Costs and funding ==
The construction costs for the first phase are reported as US$104 million. It is expected US$68 million (65.4 percent), will be borrowed and the balance of US$36 million (34.6 percent) will be equity provided by Scatec. Rand Merchant Bank and the International Finance Corporation have agreed to provide loans for the first phase of this project.

== Construction timetable ==
Having achieved financial close in December 2023, it is expected that construction will begin in Q1 2024. Construction began on 24 March 2024, witnessed by Mokgweetsi Masisi, the President of Botswana. Commercial commissioning of the first phase is anticipated in Q4 of 2025.

== Other considerations ==
As of October 2023, Botswana's generation capacity was reported as 993 MW of which 80 percent was derived from coal. The first 4 MW of grid-connected solar generation Units came online that month. Mmadinare Solar Power Station is the first large-scale solar power station to be developed in the country.

== See also ==
- List of power stations in Botswana
