= Phakalane Power Station =

Photovoltaic power station in Phakalane, Botswana

Coordinates: 24°34′25″S 25°58′07″E

Phakalane Power Station Phakalane Power Station (Botswana)
- Country: Botswana
- Location: Phakalane
- Status: Operational
- Commission date: 2012
- Operator: Botswana Power Corporation

Solar farm
- Type: Standard PV
- Site area: 2.3 hectares

Power generation
- Nameplate capacity: 1.3 MW
- Annual net output: N/A (Pilot plant)

External links
- Website: http://www.bpc.bw

Phakalane Power Station is a photovoltaic pilot power plant located in Phakalane, Botswana. The power station was funded through a Japanese grant which was part of Prime Minister Hatoyama's initiative strategy called Cool Earth Partnership aimed at supporting developing countries in their efforts to combat global warming. The Cool Earth Partnership is part of the initiatives which saw Hatoyama win the Sustainable Development Leadership Award in 2010.

== See also ==
- List of power stations in Botswana
- Tati Solar Power Station
