= Bujagali Energy Limited =

Ugandan electric energy generating company

Coordinates: 00°19′59″N 33°07′43″E

- Company type: Private Public Partnership
- Industry: Renewable Energy Power Generation
- Founded: 2004; 22 years ago
- Headquarters: Njeru, Uganda
- Key people: Alaister McDougall; General Manager
- Products: Hydro Electricity
- Number of employees: 60
- Website: www.bujagali-energy.com

Bujagali Energy Limited (BEL) is a hydropower generating company in Uganda. The company owns and operates the Bujagali Hydroelectric Power Station, the largest hydropower plant in the country as of July 2014.

== Overview ==
BEL is a single purpose company, formed to develop the 250MW Bujagali Hydropower Station. Under Private Public Partnership with the government of Uganda (GOU), BEL will own and operate the power plant for 30 years, starting with commissioning in 2012. After the 30 years, BEL will transfer ownership of the station to the GOU for US$1.00. The power generated is sold to the Uganda Electricity Transmission Company Limited, the Uganda electricity transmitter monopoly. The power purchase agreements were executed between the concerned parties, in December 2005.

== Power stations ==
BEL owns and operates the Bujagali Hydroelectric Power Station, a 250-megawatt hydropower station built on the Victoria Nile at a cost of US$900 million between 2007 and 2012.

== Ownership ==
As of September 2016, the shareholders in BEL were as listed in the table below. In May 2018, the Daily Nation newspaper reported that Jubilee Holdings Limited was set to invest an additional KSh4.4 billion (US$44 million) in the business, in addition to the KSh5.5 billion (US$55 million) that it had already invested. In August 2018, Sithe Global Power of the United States exited the company and SN Power AS of Norway acquired shareholding in the business. After the exit of Sithe Global Power in 2018, the shareholding was adjusted as reflected in the table below. SN Power AS was acquired by Scatec along with its assets on 29 January 2021.

Shareholding In Bujagali Energy Limited
Rank	Name of Owner	% Ownership in 2018	% Ownership in 2020
1	Jubilee Investment Company	8.80	18.24
2	Government of Uganda	10.00	10.00
3	Scatec (formerly SN Power AS)	64.89	55.45
4	Aga Khan Fund for Economic Development	16.31	16.31
	Total	100.0	100.0

== Financing ==
The following entities contributed funds to build the power station. As of July 2019, the restructured debt package was approximately US$500 million, with IFC contributing about US$100 million to the total new loan package.

Modified Fund Sources for Bujagali Power Station
No.	Name of Lender	Loan Amount (US$)	Percentage
1	International Finance Corporation	100	20.0
2	African Development Bank		
3	European Investment Bank		
4	German Investment Corporation		
5	KfW of Germany		
6	PROPARCO of France		
7	French Development Agency		
8	Netherlands Development Finance Company		
	Total	500.00	100.00

In December 2017, the Ugandan government reached consensus with the power station's financiers on restructuring the loans and waiving taxes on the power generated, to enable the cost of power to the consumer to reduce. In July 2018, with about US$450 million of the US$900 million construction loan repaid, the remaining loan was restructured and extended for another 15 years, thereby lowering the loan payments and related electricity tariffs to as low as US$0.08 per unit, for large industrial customers. The new lower electricity rates were expected to commence in July 2018.

== See also ==
- Electricity Regulatory Authority
- West Nile Rural Electrification Company
- Kiira Power Station
- Nalubaale Power Station
