= Jubilee Insurance =

Jubilee Insurance Company Limited may refer to:

- Jubilee Holdings Limited, parent company of insurance companies in Africa
- Jubilee Insurance Company Limited, insurance company active in Kenya
- Jubilee Insurance (Pakistan), insurance company active in Pakistan
