= Jwaneng Solar Power Station =

Solar farm in Botswana

- Country: Botswana
- Location: Jwaneng, Southern District
- Coordinates: 24°38′35″S 24°39′55″E
- Status: Proposed
- Construction began: H2 2024 Expected
- Commission date: H2 2025 Expected
- Construction cost: US$78.3 million
- Owner: Sinotswana Green Energy
- Operator: Sinotswana Green Energy

Solar farm
- Type: Flat-panel PV

Power generation
- Nameplate capacity: 100 MW

The Jwaneng Solar Power Station is a 100 MW (130,000 hp) solar power station, under development in Botswana. Two Chinese companies and one Botswana independent power producer (IPP) formed a consortium that owns the project. Botswana Power Corporation (BPC), the national electricity utility company is the power off-taker, under a 25-year power purchase agreement.

== Location ==
The power station would be located in the town of Jwaneng, in the Southern District of Botswana. Jwaneng is located approximately 171 kilometres (106 mi) west of Gaborone, the capital city of Botswana.

== Developers ==
The power station is under development by a consortium comprising two Chinese companies and one Botswana IPP. The shareholders in the business formed a special purpose vehicle (SPV) company to own, design, build, operate and maintain this energy infrastructure. The SPV company is called Sinotswana Green Energy. The table below illustrates the shareholding in the SPV company.

Shareholding In Sinotswana Green Energy
Rank	Shareholder	Domicile	Percentage	Notes
1	China Harbour Engineering	China	55.0	
2	China International Water Resources and Hydropower	China	30.0	
3	New Energy Company Proprietary Limited	Botswana	15.0	
	Total		100.00	

== Costs ==
The cost of construction is reported as US$78.3 million (ZAR 1.4 billion). The engineering, procurement and construction (EPC) contract was awarded to China Harbour Engineering Company and China Water and Electric Development Company. The same pair was awarded the operations and maintenance contract.

== Construction timetable ==
Construction is expected to start during H2 2024, with commercial commissioning anticipated during H2 2025.

== Other considerations ==
At a later stage it is expected that a 50 MW battery storage power station (BESS) will be installed at this power station to enable the station to supply power before the sun rises and after it sets.

Botswana, which depends on 96 percent fossil-fuel sources for its electricity as of 2024, intends to increase its sources of renewable energy generation to 50 percent of demand by 2036. This power station assists in attaining that goal.

== See also ==
- List of power stations in Botswana
