= Orapa Power Station =

Coordinates: 21°19′06″S 25°25′03″E

Orapa Power Station Orapa Power Station (Botswana)
- Country: Botswana
- Location: Orapa; Central District
- Status: Operational
- Commission date: 2011
- Operator: Botswana Power Corporation

Thermal power station
- Primary fuel: Natural Gas
- Tertiary fuel: Diesel

Power generation
- Make and model: GE LM6000 Sprint Simple Cycle
- Nameplate capacity: 90 MW
- Annual net output: N/A (Peaking power plant)

External links
- Website: http://www.bpc.bw

The Orapa Power Station is a Peak load power generation plant located in the mining town of Orapa in northeastern Botswana in the Central District. It is built within the Debswana Diamond Company Ltd Orapa diamond mine fenced leased area and owned by the Government of Botswana who mandated the Botswana Power Corporation to manage, operate and maintain the facility.

== Background ==
The plant construction was initiated when Botswana started experiencing electricity supply challenges from year 2007 when demand for electricity in the country started exceeding the county's electricity generation capacity leading to forced periodic nationwide load shedding excises by the Botswana Power Corporation. The plant was a short term response to the mining industry electricity requirements prior to the development of Mmamabula and Morupule B power stations.

The plant site is located next to an electrical substation through which it connects to the national grid and was designed to use either natural gas or diesel as fuel. It was commissioned using diesel with a planned conversion to natural gas once construction of a gas pipeline from nearby gas fields was complete and commissioned.

== Specifications ==
The plant consists of two 45MW GE LM6000 Sprint Simple Cycle gas turbines fueled using diesel. The energy produced is transferred to the national grid via the interconnected Orapa Substation by use of two short 132kV overhead power lines.

== See also ==
- List of power stations in Botswana
- List of natural gas power stations
