= Ezekiel Morake =

Motswana footballer

Personal information
- Date of birth: 21 March 1996 (age 30)
- Place of birth: Selebi-Phikwe, Botswana
- Height: 1.85 m (6 ft 1 in)
- Position: Goalkeeper

Senior career*
Years	Team	Apps	(Gls)
2014–2015	FC Satmos		
2015–2019	Jwaneng Galaxy		
2019–2020	TS Galaxy	4	(0)
2020–2022	Jwaneng Galaxy		
2022–2023	Ethiopian Coffee	15	(0)

International career^{‡}
2019–	Botswana	10	(0)
- * Club domestic league appearances and goals as of 9 May 2023 ‡ National team caps and goals as of 3 October 2021

Ezekiel Morake (born 21 March 1996) is a Motswana professional footballer who plays as a goalkeeper for the Botswana national team and Joined Tonota F.C for the 2026/27 football season.
