= Letlhakane Concentrated Solar Power Station =

Power station in Botswana

- Country: Botswana
- Location: Letlhakane, Central District
- Coordinates: 21°26′23″S 25°36′44″E
- Status: Proposed
- Construction began: 2023 (expected)
- Commission date: 2027 (expected)

Solar farm
- Type: CSP

Power generation
- Nameplate capacity: 100 MW (130,000 hp)

The Letlhakane Concentrated Solar Power Station (Note: Also referred to as Letlhakane Solar Thermal Power Station) is a planned 100 MW (130,000 hp) concentrated solar power station in Botswana. The owner, developer and operator of this solar power complex will be an independent power producer, whose identity will be revealed when the ongoing open bidding is concluded. Bids were received until June 2022. The power generated here is expected to be bought by Botswana Power Corporation (BPC), who will integrate it into the national grid, under a long-term power purchase agreement (PPA). This power station is being simultaneously developed with the 100 MW Maun Concentrated Solar Power Station.

== Location ==
The power station would be located in the town of Letlhakane, in the Central District of Botswana, approximately 196 kilometres (122 mi) northwest of the city of Serowe, the district capital. This is approximately 500 kilometres (311 mi) northwest of Gaborone, the capital and largest city of Botswana.

== Overview ==
This power station's design calls for use of concentrated solar power (CSP) technology. Under this system of power generation, energy from the sun is trapped by curved mirrors. The light is concentrated to generate heat in the range of 400–500 °C (752–932 °F). That heat is used to boil water to create steam, which is then used to turn electric generators. The design may include the use of molten salts technology to store electricity and release it after sunset and/or before sunrise.

== Timeline ==
The tender documents call for the power station to commence commercial operations in the 2026/2027 financial year (July 2026 to June 2027).

== Other considerations ==
As of September 2022, Botswana's national electricity demand was estimated at 550 MW. At that time national generation capacity was 450 MW. The country imports an additional 150 MW from South Africa. The government of Botswana has plans to increase its installed capacity by developing new solar power stations, thereby achieving energy autonomy from South Africa. This power station is part of those efforts.

== See also ==
- List of power stations in Botswana
