= BCL =

BCL may stand for:

== Language ==
- The Central Bikol language, according to ISO 639-3

== Law & politics ==
- Bachelor of Civil Law, the term used to describe a variety of legal degrees offered by universities in English-speaking countries (as distinct from Canon Law and Common Law)
- Bangladesh Chhatra League, the student wing of Bangladesh Awami League
- British Common Law, the legal system, developed in England after the Norman Conquest in 1066, used by approximately one third of the global population.

== Logic ==
- Binary combinatory logic

== People ==
- Bunga Citra Lestari, Indonesian actress and singer

== Science ==
- Members of the Bcl-2 family, a group of related proteins involved in apoptosis, particularly bcl-2

== Sports ==
- Baltimore Catholic League
- Bangladesh Championship League, 2nd tier of Bangladesh football league system
- Bangladesh Cricket League, an annual four-team first-class cricket competition in Bangladesh
- Bay Counties League, part of the Bay Area Conference
- Baseball Challenge League
- Baseball Champions League Americas
- Baseball Champions League Europe
- Basketball Champions League, along with the EuroCup, it is one of the two secondary professional European-wide club basketball competitions
- Boston City League, a high school athletic conference in Massachusetts, United States

== Technology ==
- Base Class Library, a computer programming standard library which forms a fundamental part of the Standard Libraries of the Common Language Infrastructure

== Transport ==
- Barra del Colorado Airport in Barra del Colorado, Costa Rica
- Bencoolen MRT station in Singapore (MRT station abbreviation)
- Big Circle Line in Moscow, Russian Federation

== Other uses ==
- the ISO 639-3 code for the Central Bikol language
- Bass clarinet
- Belfast Central Library
- Birmingham Central Library
- British Cellophane Limited
- Broadcast Communications Limited (New Zealand), now Kordia
- BCL Limited, formerly Bamangwato Concessions Limited, a mining company in Botswana
- "B.C.L. RED", a designation of the fictional superhero Soldier Boy in the television series The Boys
