= Botswana Power Corporation Workers' Union =

Trade union in Botswana

BPCWU
- Botswana Power Corporation Workers' Union
- Headquarters: Palapye, Botswana
- Location: Botswana
- Key people: Emanuel Tseleng, general secretary
- Affiliations: BFTU

The Botswana Power Corporation Workers' Union (BPCWU) is a trade union representing staff at the Botswana Power Corporation. It is an affiliate of the Botswana Federation of Trade Unions in Botswana.

== See also ==
- Botswana Power Corporation
