= Old Palapye =

Old Palapye Monument
- Old Palapye
- Old Palapye church, now in ruins
- Interactive map of Old Palapye Monument
- Location: 20 km away from Palapye town
- Coordinates: 22°33′S 27°08′E

Old Palapye is a heritage site located in Botswana, near a town called Palapye. Old Palapye and Palapye are two different places according to the residents there, Palapye is a modernised town. The site is located 20 km away from the Palapye town and the people living around call it Malaka village This monument site is called Old Palapye because it carries the history of the ancient nature which differentiates it from the Palapye town.

Old Palapye is a crucial site which has many artifacts in it from the middle, late and stone age history. Old Palapye became famous because the remains of the Ngwato capital which was found in the year 1889 during the ruling of the famous Kgosi Khama III from 1889-1902. Kgosi Khama III initially lived in a village called Shoshong village and later moved to Old Palapye because of shortage of water in Shoshong.He later moved to Serowe due to the same reason he moved from Shoshong. The attraction to the monument includes the perennial spring and water falls, stone remains of roundavels and rock paintings.

The large much-photographed London Missionary Society (LMS) church ruins that were built in about 1892 and abandoned in 1902 are located at 22°38′44″S 27°17′33″E.
