= Tati Solar Power Station =

Solar farm in Tati, Francistown, Botswana

Tati Solar Power Station Tati Solar Power Station (Botswana)
- Country: Botswana
- Location: Tati, Francistown
- Coordinates: 21°31′12″S 27°48′16″E
- Status: Under construction
- Construction began: 2026 (expected)
- Commission date: 2027 (expected)
- Construction cost: US$100 million
- Owner: Tati Solar Company

Solar farm
- Type: Flat-panel PV

Power generation
- Nameplate capacity: 100 MW

Tati Solar Power Station (TSPS) is a planned solar power station in Botswana. The power station is under development by a consortium that comprises two independent power producers (IPPs), one based in Botswana, and the other based in the United Kingdom. Investors in the solar project come from South Africa, United Kingdom and the Netherlands. When completed, this renewable energy infrastructure project is expected to become the first privately owned, large-scale grid-ready, solar power plant in the country.

== Location ==
The power station would be located on 300 hectares (1.2 mi^{2}), in Tati, outside the city of Francistown, the country's second-largest city. Francistown is located about 433 kilometres (269 mi), north-east of the city of Gaborone, the capital of Botswana.

== Overview ==
The power station has a planned capacity of 100 megawatts. It will be developed in phases. The first phase will have capacity of 50 megawatts. As of February 2021, the developers had received an environmental certificate of compliance from the relevant local authorities. In July 2021, the Botswana Energy Regulatory Authority (BERA) also approved the project, and issued a generation license.

== Developers ==
The power station is under development by a consortium comprising Shumba Energy Limited from Botswana and Solarcentury Africa, based in the United Kingdom.

Shumba Energy Limited

Shumba Energy Limited is a Botswana-based "mineral exploration company, with a portfolio of exploration and mining coal projects". The company's shares are publicly listed on the Botswana Stock Exchange and co-listed on the Mauritius Stock Exchange.

Solarcentury Africa

Solarcentury Africa is a subsidiary of BB Energy, an independent energy trading company, based in the United Kingdom. It primarily deals in "gasoil, gasoline, bitumen and fuel oil". As of August 2021, Solarcentury maintains a portfolio of 2.1 gigawatts of installed generation capacity, sold to mining operations, commercial and industrial clients in Africa.

The owner/developers of this power station are expected to create a special purpose vehicle company to own and operate the solar farm. For descriptive purposes, this SPV is called Tati Solar Company here. The table below illustrates the shareholding in Tati Solar Company.

Shareholding in Tati Solar Company
Rank	Shareholder	Domicile	Description	Notes
1	Shumba Energy	Botswana	Independent Power Producer	
2	Solarcentury Africa	United Kingdom	Independent Solar Power Producer	

== Funding ==
In June 2026, the developers of this project obtained a syndicated loan of US$100 million to adance the development. The lead arranger for the financing was Rand Merchant Bank of South Africa.

== See also ==
- List of power stations in Botswana
- Phakalane Power Station
