= Morupule Colliery =

- Location in Botswana
- Location: Palapye,, Botswana; 22°30′42″S 27°01′19″E
- Products: Coal (877,000 tonnes per annum)
- Company: Debswana
- Acquired: 2000

The Morupule Colliery is a coal mine located in Palapye, Botswana, owned and operated by Debswana, a partnership between the government of Botswana and De Beers. The coalfield is composed of four main seams, only one of which, the No. 1 Seam, is currently being mined, using bord and pillar mining methods.

Founded in 1971 to supply the Bamangwato Concessions Ltd copper and nickel mine, operations have expanded considerably since then to supply regional power plants and industries, especially the nearby Morupule Power Station. Morupule was granted an extension to its mining lease in 1980.

== Expansion ==
In January 2008, a small wash plant was commissioned with a production capacity of 120 tonnes per hour. The purpose of this plant was to supply higher quality coal to local and regional consumers. The project received support from the Botswana government, as it aimed to stimulate the local economy, produce a cleaner form of coal compared to run-of-mine coal, and offer an alternative to the unsustainable use of wood for cooking and heating.

A major expansion to the colliery is planned for 2010 and 2011. The primary purpose of the expansion is to supply coal to the adjacent Botswana Power Corporation B phase 1 power station (600 MW) that is under construction in 2010 and 2011. The power station is required to allow Botswana to become self-sufficient in power generation (in 2010, around 84% of the country's power needs were imported, mostly from Eskom in South Africa, and Eskom has indicated a phased reduction in power supply starting in 2008). The colliery expansion will see production levels increase from just under 1 million tonnes per annum to 2.8 million tons per annum. The project began with feasibility studies and designs in 2007, construction on site began in September 2010, and first coal from the expanded mine and plant is expected in November 2011. The project budget is some P1.47 billion. The colliery currently employs around 320 people (mostly drawn from the nearby town of Palapye) and after the expansion will provide permanent employment to around 480 people.

The expanded mine consists of increasing the number of continuous miner sections from two to four, constructing a new crushing and screening plant to replace the existing plant, and upgrading or constructing new offices and workshops. New houses will be constructed to house the expanded workforce. A connecting pipeline has been constructed to the North-South Carrier water pipeline some 15 km away near Palapye in order to supply surface water to the mine.

While any coal mine has a negative environmental impact, and the coal burnt in a power station results in carbon dioxide emissions, the colliery has taken steps to make the negative environmental impact as low as possible: the colliery received ISO 14001 certification in 2010, and activities are controlled using a formal Environmental Management System. All required environmental permitting is in place and EIAs are publicly accessible on the Expansion Project website*. Use of water in a water scarce country is reduced by performing dry screening in the plant, storm water is captured and re-used, and replenishable surface water from the North-South carrier is used. Care was taken during design to construct a plant with a small footprint and the plant will be placed on previously disturbed ground. Energy saving initiatives (energy efficient motors, lighting and solar water heating etc.) have been incorporated into the design. The mine does not produce any discards, does not deposit fines on a slimes dam (these are dispatched to BPC to be burnt in the power station) and does not discharge any effluent water into the environment. While the colliery has mining rights over an area of some 170 square kilometers, mining is conducted below surface, and current land-use owners' rights to farm and graze cattle on tribal land have not been affected. No forced relocation of people living within the mining area has occurred. The colliery operates a small game park of some 1700 hectares in the area around the mine village, and this is used for conservation and to provide people of the area with recreation and environmental education.

The coalfield is composed of four main seams, only one of which, the No. 1 Seam, is currently being mined, below surface, using bord and pillar mining methods and continuous miners. No pillar extraction occurs, and the mine design is conservative to prevent surface subsidence. The No. 1 Seam has an average height of 8.5 meters (28 ft), an average CV of around 23.5 MJ/kg (air-dry) and is located at an average depth of 80 meters (260 ft) below surface. Production over a recent 7-year stretch averaged 877,000 tonnes per year. Overall coalfield resources within the mining lease area estimated at 5 billion tonnes of coal.

In 2021, it was announced that the mine will develop a new open cast coal mine with Basil Read to increase output by 35%.
