= White Nile =

River originating in Burundi or Rwanda

White Nile Victoria Nile, Albert Nile, Mountain Nile
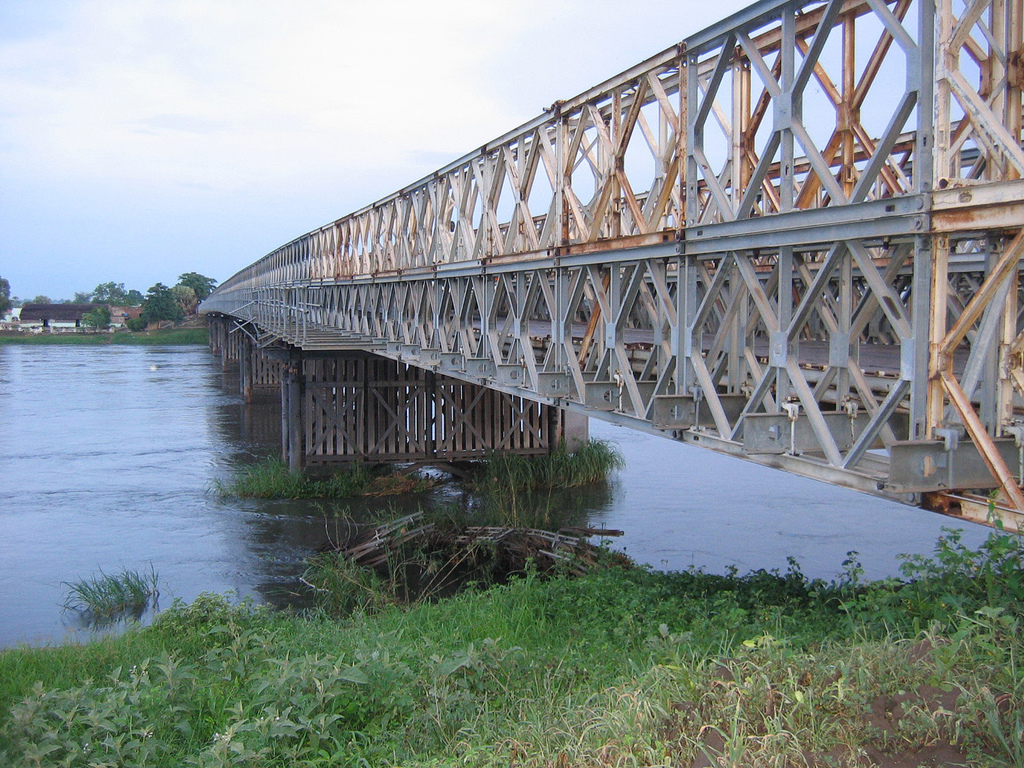
- A steel Bailey bridge spans the White Nile at Juba, South Sudan

Location
- Country: Sudan, South Sudan, Rwanda, Tanzania, Uganda, Democratic Republic of the Congo, Ethiopia, Burundi
- Cities: Jinja, Juba, Rabak, Khartoum, Omdurman

Physical characteristics
- Source: White Nile
  - location: Burundi or Rwanda
  - coordinates: 2°16′56″S 29°19′52″E
- Length: 3,700 km (2,300 mi)
- Basin size: 1,800,000 km^{2} (690,000 sq mi)
- Discharge
  - average: 878 m^{3}/s (31,000 cu ft/s)

Basin features
- Tributaries
  - left: Albert Nile, Bahr el Ghazal
  - right: Aswa, Sobat

The White Nile (Arabic: النيل الأبيض an-nīl al-'abyaḍ) is a river in North and East Africa. It is the less voluminous, but longer (and wider and shallower), of the two major tributaries of the Nile, the larger being the Blue Nile. The name "White" comes from the clay sediment carried in the water which gives the water a pale color.

In the strict meaning, "White Nile" refers to the river formed at Lake No, at the confluence of the Bahr al Jabal and Bahr el Ghazal Rivers. In the wider sense, "White Nile" refers to all the stretches of river draining from Lake Victoria through to the merger with the Blue Nile: the "Victoria Nile" from Lake Victoria via Lake Kyoga to Lake Albert, then the "Albert Nile" to the South Sudan border, and then the "Mountain Nile" or "Bahr-al-Jabal" down to Lake No. "White Nile" may sometimes include the headwaters of Lake Victoria, the most remote of which is 3,700 km (2,300 mi) from the Blue Nile.

A map showing the White Nile and the Blue Nile in East Africa.

== Course ==
=== Headwaters ===
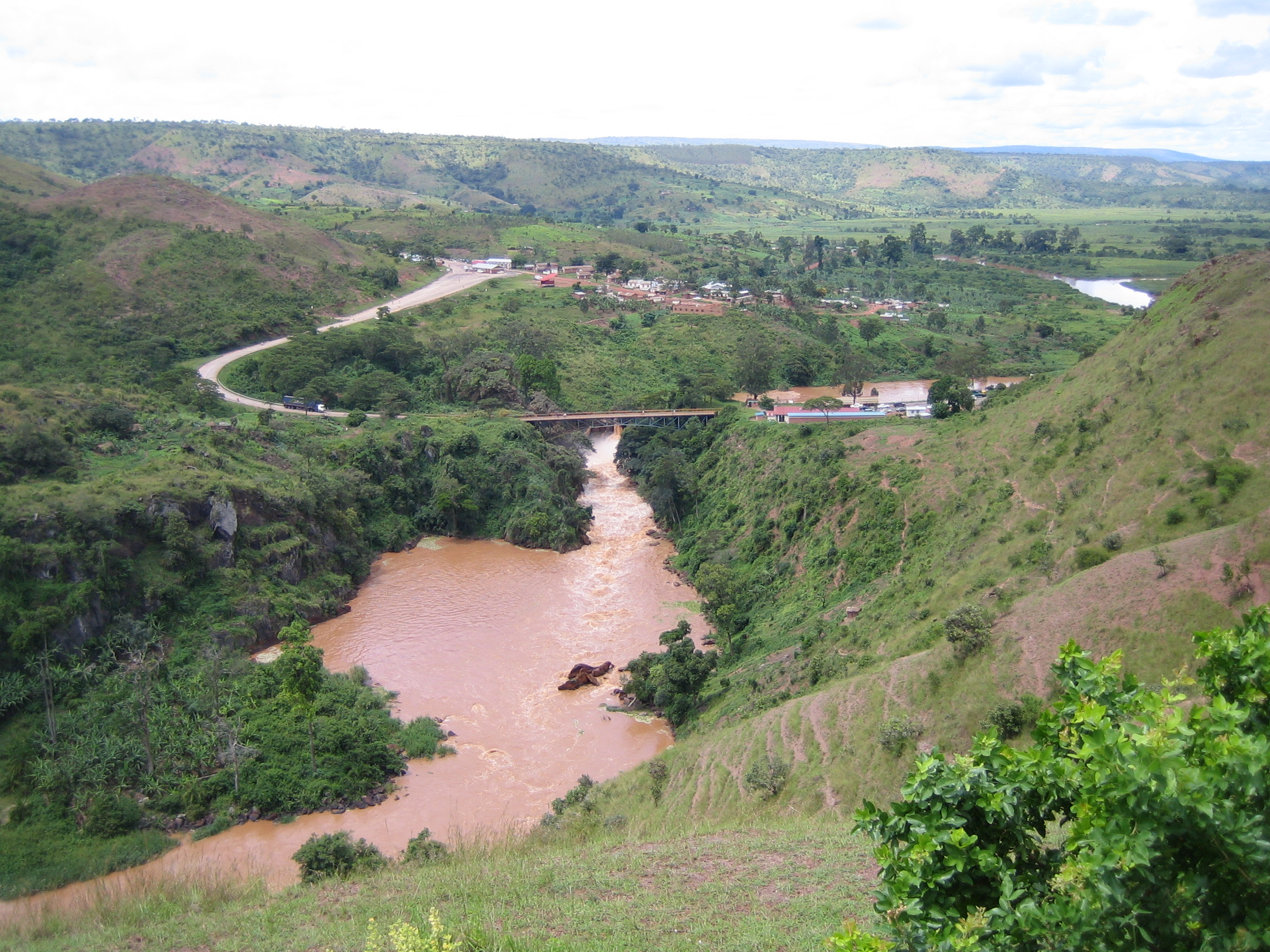
Rusumo Falls

The Kagera River, which flows into Lake Victoria near the Tanzanian town of Bukoba, is the longest feeder river for Lake Victoria, although sources do not agree on which is the longest tributary of the Kagera, and hence the most distant source of the Nile. The source of the Nile can be considered to be either the Ruvyironza, which emerges in Bururi Province, Burundi (near Bukirasaz), or the Nyabarongo, which flows from Nyungwe Forest in Rwanda.

These two feeder rivers meet near Rusumo Falls on the border between Rwanda and Tanzania. These waterfalls are known for an event on 28–29 April 1994, when 250,000 Rwandans crossed the bridge at Rusumo Falls into Ngara, Tanzania, in 24 hours, in what the United Nations High Commissioner for Refugees called "the largest and fastest refugee exodus in modern times". The Kagera forms part of the Rwanda–Tanzania and Tanzania–Uganda borders before flowing into Lake Victoria.

=== In Uganda ===
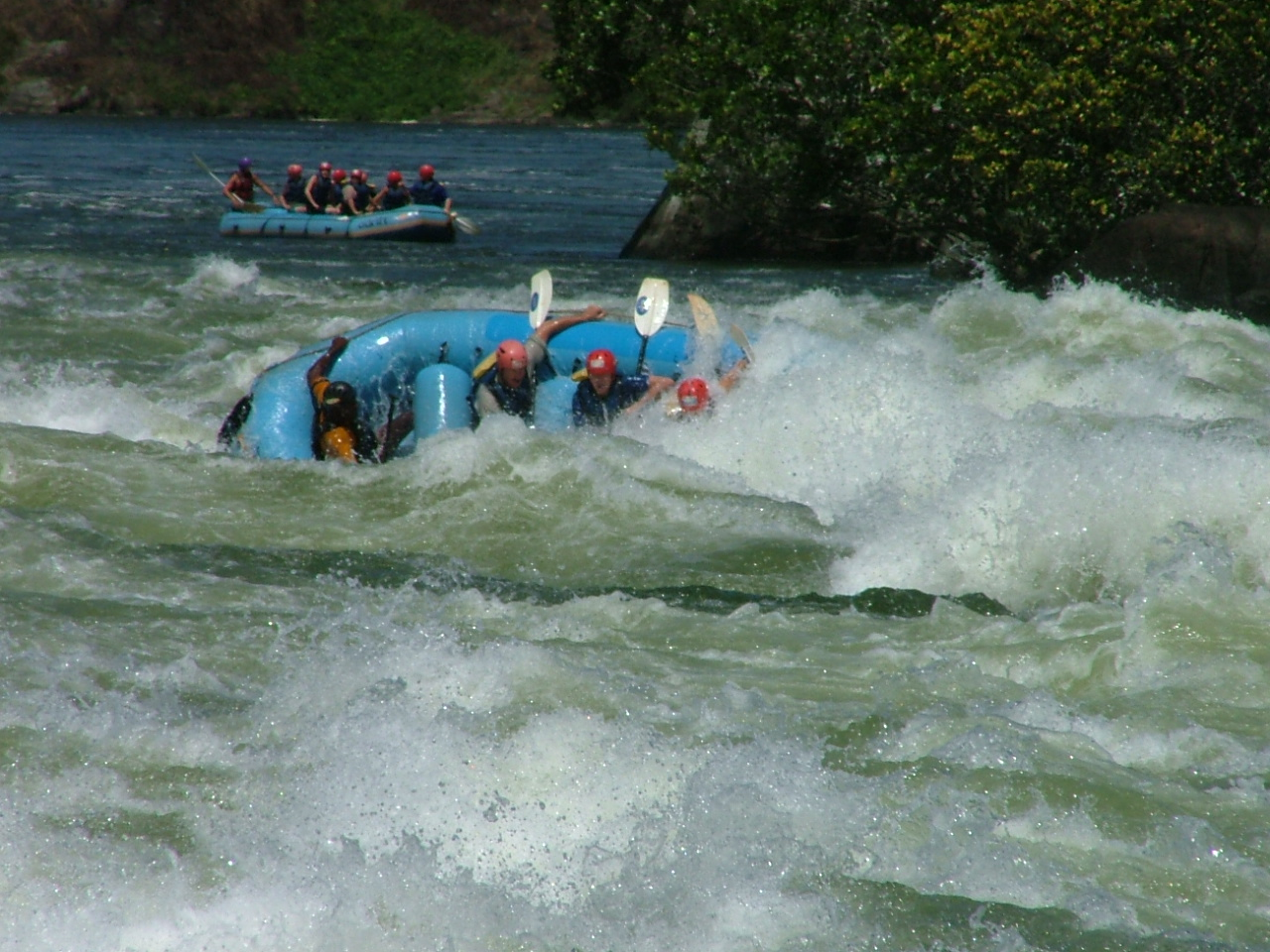
Rafters flipping in Bujagali Falls near the mouth of the Victoria Nile

The White Nile in Uganda goes under the name of "Victoria Nile" from Lake Victoria via Lake Kyoga to Lake Albert, and then as the "Albert Nile" from there to the border with South Sudan.

==== Victoria Nile ====
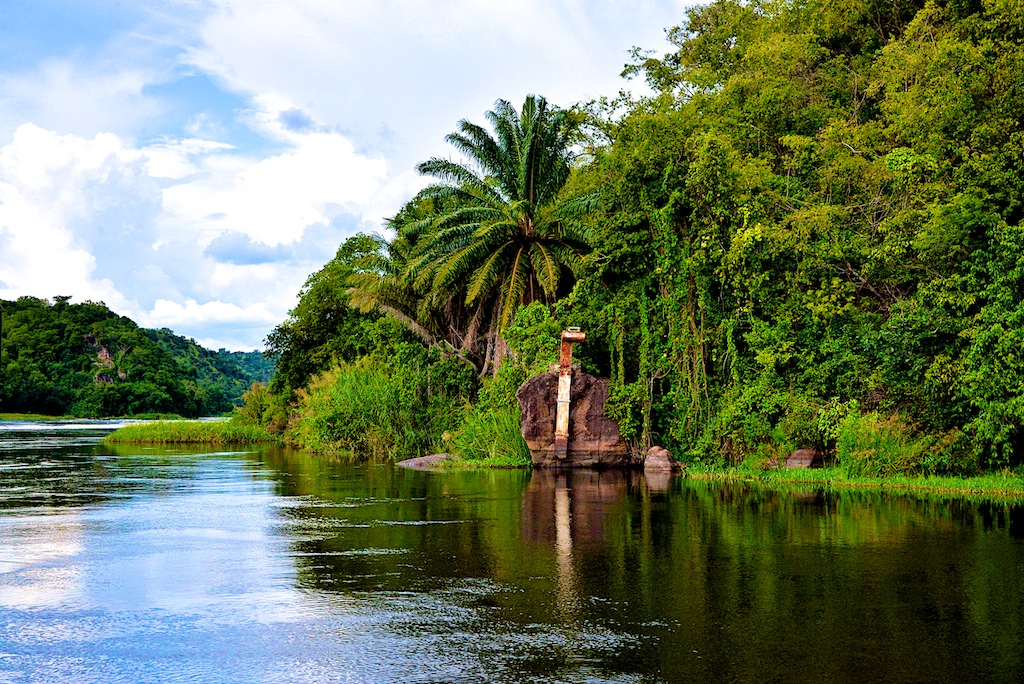
Victoria Nile, Uganda

The Victoria Nile starts at the outlet of Lake Victoria, at Jinja, Uganda, on the northern shore of the lake. Downstream from the Nalubaale Power Station and the Kiira Power Station at the outlet of the lake, the river goes over Bujagali Falls (the location of the Bujagali Power Station) about 15 km (9.3 mi) downstream from Jinja. The river then flows northwest through Uganda to Lake Kyoga in the centre of the country, thence west to Lake Albert.

At Karuma Falls, the river flows under Karuma Bridge (2°14′45.40″N 32°15′9.05″E) at the southeastern corner of Murchison Falls National Park. During much of the insurgency of the Lord's Resistance Army, Karuma Bridge, built in 1963 to help the cotton industry, was the key stop on the way to Gulu, where vehicles gathered in convoys before being provided with a military escort for the final run north. In 2009, the government of Uganda announced plans to construct a 750-megawatt hydropower project several kilometres north of the bridge, which was scheduled for completion in 2016. The World Bank had approved funding a smaller 200-megawatt power plant, but Uganda opted for a larger project, which the Ugandans will fund internally if necessary.

Just before entering Lake Albert, the river is compressed into a passage just seven meters wide at Murchison Falls, marking its entry into the western branch of the East African Rift. The river then flows into Lake Albert opposite the Blue Mountains in the Democratic Republic of the Congo.

The stretch of river from Lake Kyoga to Lake Albert is sometimes called the "Kyoga Nile".

==== Albert Nile ====
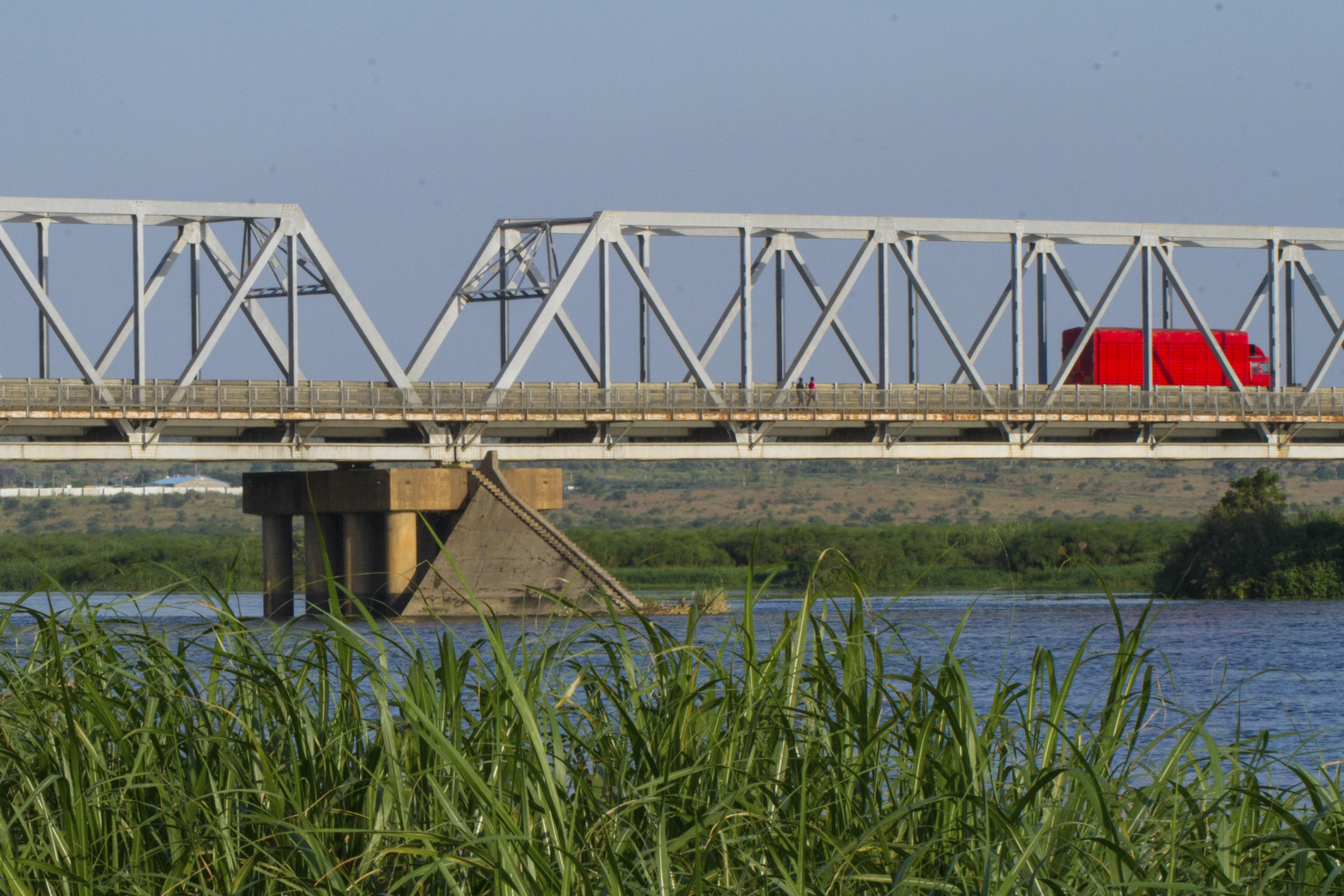
Bridge on Albert Nile

The river draining from Lake Albert to the north is called the "Albert Nile". It separates the West Nile sub-region of Uganda from the rest of the country. A bridge passes over the Albert Nile near its inlet in Nebbi District, but no other bridge over this section has been built. A ferry connects the roads between Adjumani and Moyo, and navigation of the river is otherwise done by small boat or canoe.

=== In South Sudan and Sudan ===
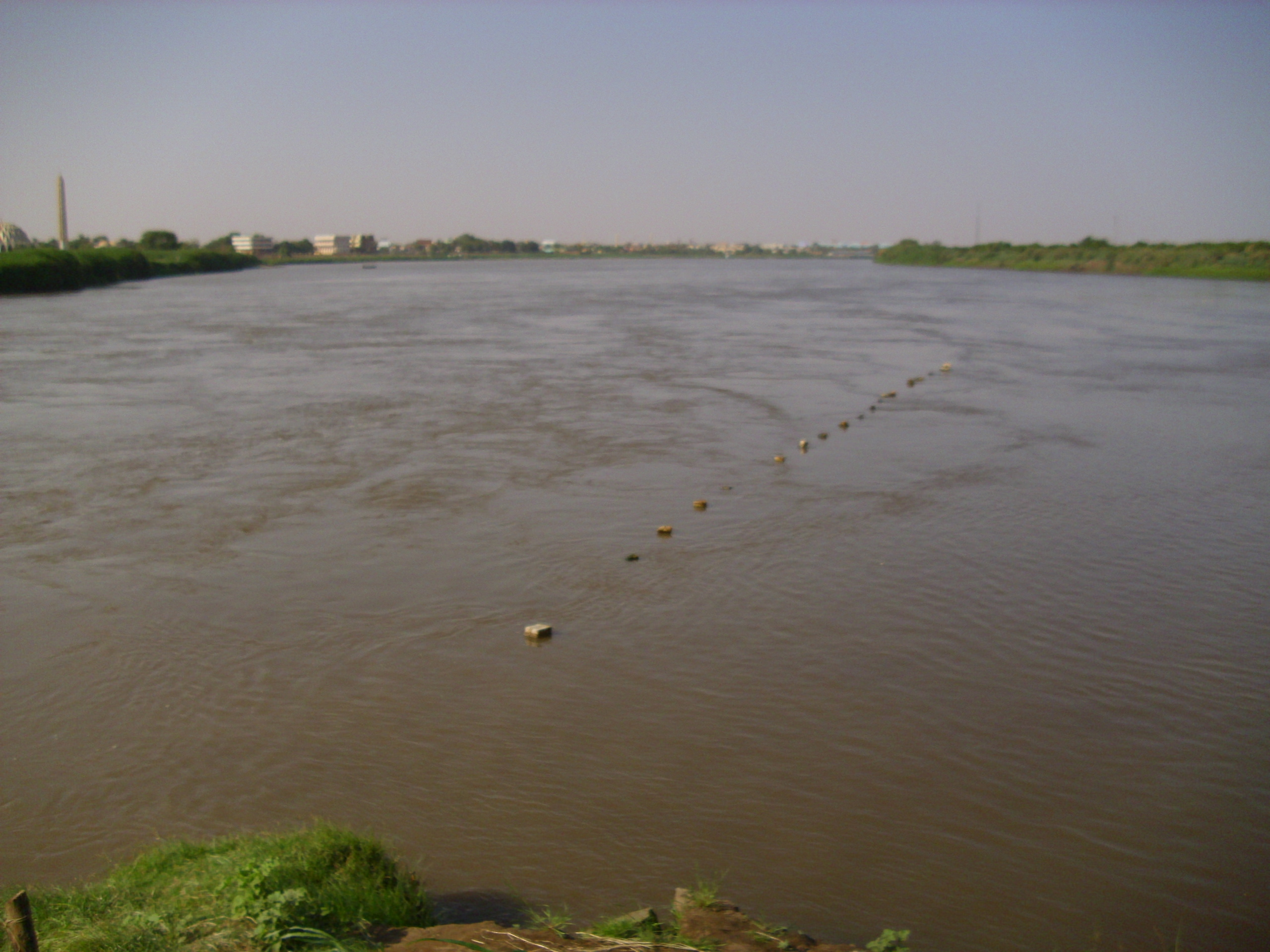
Confluence of Blue and White Nile near Khartoum

From the point at which the river enters South Sudan from Uganda, the river goes under the name of "Mountain Nile". From Lake No in South Sudan the river becomes the "White Nile" in its strictest sense and so continues northwards into Sudan where it ends at its confluence with the Blue Nile.

==== Mountain Nile ====
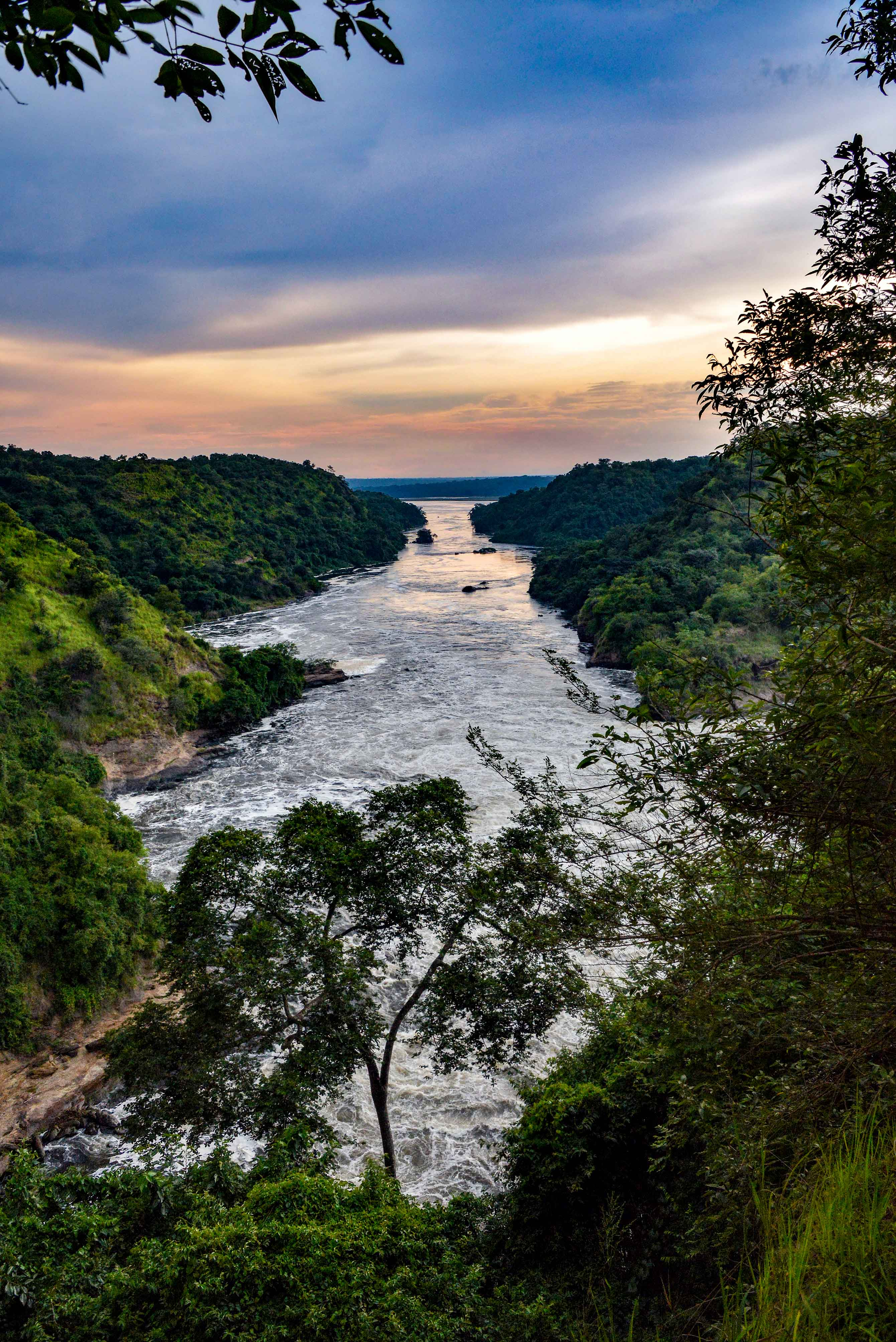
The White Nile in Uganda

From Nimule in South Sudan, close to the border with Uganda, the river becomes known as the "Mountain Nile" or "Baḥr al-Jabal" (Arabic: بحر الجبل, romanized: Baḥr el-Jebel, lit. 'sea / waters of the mountain'), meaning "Mountain River" or "River of the Mountain". (Note: The Arabic word baḥr (بحر) can refer to either a sea or a large river) The Southern Sudanese state of Central Equatoria through which the river flows were known as Bahr al-Jabal until 2006.

The southern stretch of the river passes through several rapids before reaching the Sudan plain and the vast Sudd swamp. It makes its way to Lake No, where it merges with the Bahr el Ghazal and there forms the White Nile. An anabranch river called Bahr el Zeraf flows out of the Bahr al-Jabal at and flows through the Sudd, to eventually join the White Nile. The Mountain Nile cascades through narrow gorges and over a series of rapids that includes the Fula (Fola) Rapids.

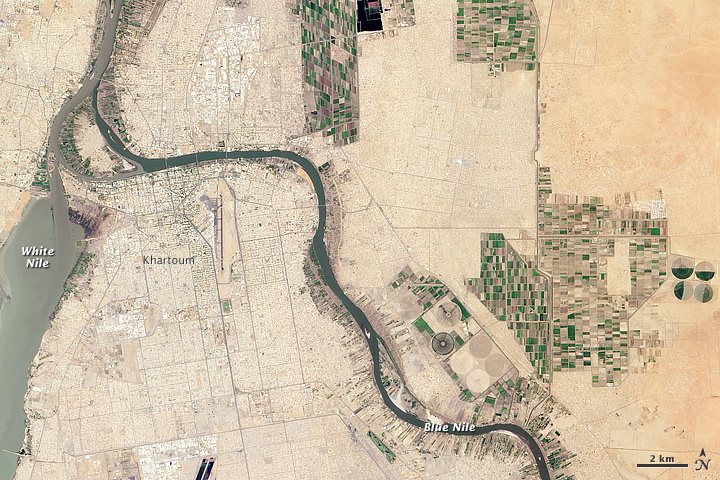
The White and Blue Niles merge at Khartoum, the capital of Sudan.

==== White Nile proper ====
To some people, the White Nile starts at the confluence of the Mountain Nile with the Bahr el Ghazal at Lake No.

The 120 kilometers of White Nile that flow east from Lake No to the mouth of the Sobat are very gently sloping and hold many swamps and lagoons. When in flood, the Sobat River tributary carries a large amount of sediment, adding greatly to the White Nile's pale color. From South Sudan's second city Malakal, the river runs slowly but swamp-free into Sudan and north to Khartoum. Downstream from Malakal lies Kodok, the site of the 1898 Fashoda Incident that marked an end to the Scramble for Africa.

In Sudan the river lends its name to the Sudanese state of White Nile, before joining the larger Blue Nile at Khartoum to form the River Nile.

== Inland waterways ==
The White Nile is a navigable waterway from the Lake Albert to Khartoum via the Jebel Aulia Dam. However, only between Juba and Uganda requires the river upgrade or channel to make it navigable.

During part of the year the rivers are navigable up to Gambela, Ethiopia, and Wau, South Sudan.

== See also ==
- List of rivers of Sudan
- List of rivers of South Sudan
