= Alf Bjørseth =

Norwegian chemist and businessman

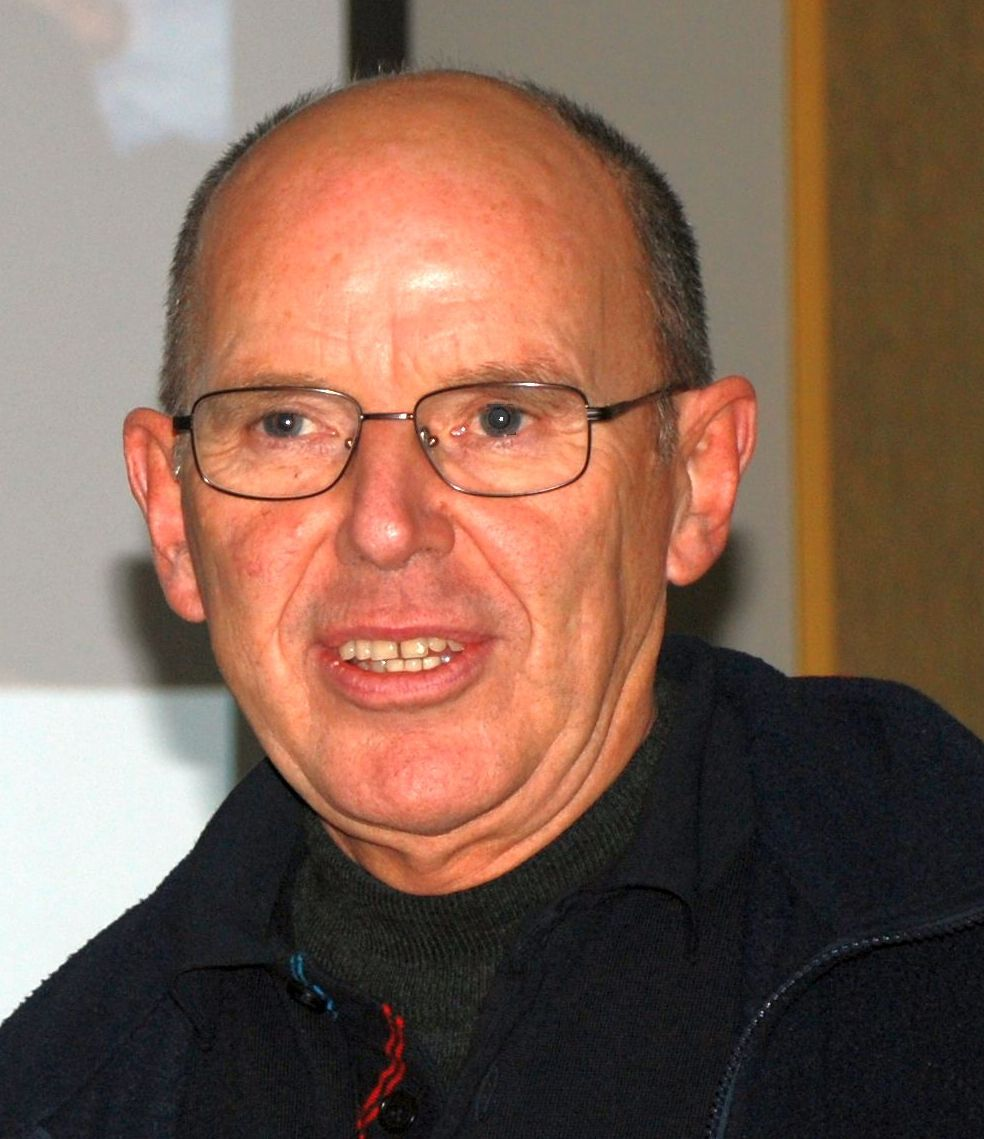
Alf Bjørseth

Alf Bjørseth (born 24 November 1941) is a Norwegian chemist and businessperson in the energy sector.

He hails from Gamle Oslo. After finishing his secondary education in 1960, he took the cand.real. degree at the University of Oslo in 1969. He was subsequently employed at SI and took his dr.philos. degree in 1979.

After spending the years 1980 to 1982 as research director at SI, he started a career in the industry sector. He was vice executive of Deminex from 1982 to 1984, director of research at Norsk Hydro from 1984 to 1990 and director of technology at Elkem from 1990 to 1994. In 1994 he founded the company ScanWafer, later REC. In 2005 he founded Norsun, then sold his shares in REC, and founded Scatec.

Bjørseth was decorated with Norwegian Chemical Society's Guldberg and Waage Medal in 2003 and became Commander of the Order of St. Olav in 2006. He is a member of the Norwegian Academy of Science and Letters and the Norwegian Academy of Technological Sciences.
