= Shepard Mosekgwa =

Motswana footballer

Personal information
- Full name: Shepard Mosekgwa
- Date of birth: 22 May 1976 (age 50)
- Place of birth: Selebi-Phikwe, Botswana
- Position: Defender

Senior career*
Years	Team	Apps	(Gls)
2000–2007	Defence Force		
2007–	Botswana Meat Commission		

International career
2002–2003	Botswana	3	(0)
- * Club domestic league appearances and goals

Shepard Mosekgwa (born 22 May 1976) is a Motswana retired footballer.

Born in Selebi-Phikwe, Mosekgwa played as a defender for BDF XI, TAFIC, Orapa Wanderers, Nico United and Jwaneng Comets.

He played for the Botswana national football team between 2002 and 2003, including a substitute's appearance in Botswana's 2003 COSAFA Cup first round 1–0 victory against Namibia.
