= Palapye Airport =

Airport in Botswana

- IATA: QPH; ICAO: FBPY

Summary
- Serves: Palapye, Botswana
- Elevation AMSL: 3,000 ft (910 m)
- Coordinates: 22°33′50″S 27°08′15″E

Map
- Location of airport in Botswana

Runways
Direction	Length		Surface
Direction	m	ft	Surface
07/25	1,100	3,609	Grass
- Source: GCM Google Maps

Palapye Airport (IATA: QPH, ICAO: FBPY) is an airstrip serving Palapye, a city in the Central District of Botswana. The runway is on the southeast side of the town.

Palapye Airport was built in 1919 with a landing ground measuring 600 by 600 yards.

== See also ==
- Transport in Botswana
- List of airports in Botswana
