= Morupule Thermal Power Station =

Coal-powered power station in Botswana

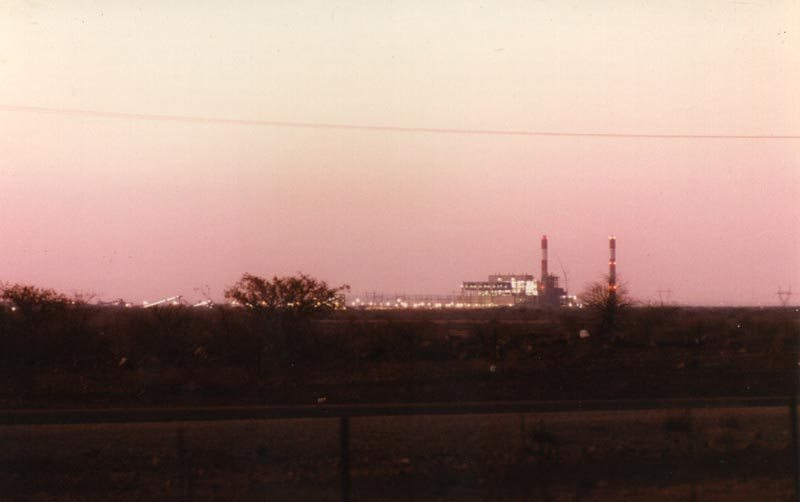
- Morupule Thermal Power Station
- Country: Botswana
- Location: Palapye
- Coordinates: 22°31′12″S 27°02′12″E
- Status: Operational
- Construction began: Morupule A: 1982; Morupule B: 2010
- Commission date: Morupule A: 1989; Morupule B: 2014
- Owner: Botswana Power Corporation
- Operator: Botswana Power Corporation

Thermal power station
- Primary fuel: Coal

Power generation
- Units operational: Morupule A: 4 × 33 MW; Morupule B: 4 x 150 MW
- Nameplate capacity: Morupule A: 132 MW; Morupule B: 600 MW

Morupule Thermal Power Station is a coal-fired power station in Botswana. It is responsible for an estimated 80 percent of the country's domestic power generation.

== Location ==
The power station is located near the town of Palapye, in the Central District, approximately 270 kilometres (168 mi), by road, north-east of Gaborone, Botswana's capital city. The geographical coordinates of Morupule Thermal Power Station are 22°31'12.0"S, 27°02'12.0"E (Latitude: -22.520000; Longitude: 27.036667).

== Overview ==
=== Morupule A ===
Morupule A Power Station comprises four air-cooled 33-megawatt coal-fired units, with coal supplied from the adjacent Morupule Colliery, owned by Debswana. The station's total power generation capacity is 132 megawatts. Construction of the existing station started in 1982 and was completed in 1989.

In 2016, the government of Botswana sourced funds to renovate and restore Morupule A. The contract was won by Doosan Heavy Industries & Construction at a contract price of BWP:2.5 billion (US$204 million in 2016). The upgrade was expected to last until 2018. Upon completion of the upgrade, Morupule A is expected to function at 80 percent plant availability for another 15 years (until 2033).

=== Morupule B ===
Botswana Power Corporation (BPC) was considering an expansion of the Morupule Power Station since 2006. BPC eventually decided on 600 megawatts, consisting of four 150 megawatt units. At the time when this project was conceptualized, 80 percent of the electricity consumed in Botswana was imported from the South African utility, Eskom. The World Bank and the African Development Bank both provided partial funding to the construction of Morupule B. In 2010 construction began, with the lead contractor being China National Electric Equipment Corporation (CNEEC). Completion was expected in 2012.

However, by April 2013, Units I and II were out of service, undergoing repairs for cracks in their air ducts, that developed soon after installation. Unit III, the only functioning unit at the time, had also developed the same problem. Unit IV was still under construction. This led to a severe power shortage, resulting in load shedding and rolling blackouts.

In January 2014, the government of Botswana hired STEAG Energy Services of Germany to “identify problems created by CNEEC and rectify them”. After CNEEC was forced to leave on 31 December 2013, STEAG took over maintenance and operation of Morupule B, effective 1 January 2014. Installation of all four units was completed in 2014. In June 2018, the government of Botswana terminated talks with state-owned China Machinery Engineering Corporation (CMEC), in attempts to divest from Morupule B. These negotiations had been ongoing since 2016. In 2018, the power station was operating at about 81 percent capacity (producing approximately 486 megawatts).

== Controversy ==
The Morupule B Power Station has been beset with problems since the start of the project. A forensic investigation into the matter has found that Botswana Power Company staff members colluded with CNEEC to embezzle more than BWP 1 billion (approx. US$90.5 million in 2014), from the BWP 10 billion (approx. US$905 million) Morupule B power project.

== Ownership ==
Morupule A and Morupule B are both owned 100 percent by the Botswana Power Corporation (BPC).

== See also ==
- List of power stations in Botswana
