= Jubilee Holdings Limited =

Kenyan financial firm

- Company type: Public company
- Traded as: KN: JUB
- Industry: Insurance and finance
- Founded: 1937
- Headquarters: Nairobi, Kenya
- Key people: Zul Abdul (Group Chairman); Julius Kipng’etich (Group CEO); Juan Cazcarra (Deputy Group CEO)
- Products: Insurance, Investments, Real estate, Asset management services
- Revenue: USD 408 million / KES 53 billion (2024)
- Total assets: US$1,643 million (KES:214 billion) (2024)
- Number of employees: 993 (2024)
- Website: www.jubileeinsurance.com

Jubilee Holdings Limited is a financial services holding company with headquarters in Nairobi, Kenya. The company maintains subsidiaries in Kenya, Uganda, Tanzania and Burundi. Its activities are mainly in the insurance sector.

Jubilee Holdings Limited is a large financial services conglomerate in East Africa. As of December 2024, the company controlled assets valued at over US$1,643 million (KES 214 billion), with shareholders' equity of approximately US$393 million (KES 51 billion). representing the largest for an insurance group in the East African Community.

== Jubilee Holdings Limited ==
The following is a list of subsidiaries (50+% shareholding) and associated companies (less than 50% shareholding) of Jubilee Holdings Limited, who together form the Jubilee Group.

=== Subsidiaries ===
- Jubilee Life Insurance Company of Kenya Limited – 100% shareholding – Kenya –
- Jubilee Health Insurance Company of Kenya Limited – 100% shareholding – Kenya
- Jubilee Health Insurance Company of Uganda Limited - 65% shareholding - Uganda
- Jubilee Life Insurance Company of Uganda Limited - 65% shareholding - Uganda
- Jubilee Health Insurance Company of Tanzania Limited - 51% shareholding - Tanzania
- Jubilee Life Insurance Corporation of Tanzania Limited - 51% shareholding - Tanzania
- Jubilee Insurance Company of Burundi S.A. - 70% shareholding - Burundi - A general and long term insurance provider in Burundi. 20% of this venture is held by the group's sister company, the Diamond Trust Bank Group. The two have AKFED as a common shareholder
- Jubilee Asset Management Limited - 100% - Kenya - A fund management company in Kenya.
- Jubilee Investments Company Limited - 100% shareholding - Uganda - An investments holding company.
- Jubilee Investments Tanzania Limited - 100% shareholding - Tanzania - An investments holding company.
- Jubilee Investments Burundi Limited - 100% shareholding - Burundi - An investments holding company.
- Jubilee Center Burundi - 80% shareholding - Burundi - A property investment company.

=== Associated companies ===
- PDM (Holdings) Limited - 37.1% - Kenya - An investment vehicle through which the group has invested in the equity of Property Development and Management (K) Limited which conducts property investment, development and management.
- IPS Cable Systems Limited - 33.3% - Mauritius - An investment vehicle through which the group has invested in the equity of the 15,000 km Seacom submarine fiber optic cable.
- FCL Holdings Limited - 30.0% - Kenya - An investment vehicle through which the group has invested in the equity of Farmers Choice Limited with its main objective being sale of fresh and processed meat products.
- IPS Power Investment Limited - 27.0% - Kenya - An investment vehicle through which the group has invested in the equity of Tsavo Power Company Limited that generates electricity for sale.
- Bujagali Holding Power Company Limited - 25.0% shareholding - Uganda - An investment vehicle through which the group has invested in the equity of Bujagali Energy Limited an electricity generating company in Uganda.

=== Investment ===
- Diamond Trust Bank Group - 10.27% shareholding - A major banking group in East Africa, active in Burundi, Kenya, Tanzania and Uganda. Held through Jubilee Insurance Company Limited.

== Shareholding ==
The shares of stock of the holding company are listed on the stock exchanges in Nairobi, Kampala, and Dar es Salaam. The largest shareholders in the company as of December 2015 are listed in the table below:

Jubilee Holdings Limited stock ownership

Rank	Name of owner	Percentage ownership
1	Aga Khan Fund for Economic Development	37.98
2	Pyrus Investments Limited	9.82
3	Freight Forwarders Kenya Limited	1.95
4	United Housing Estates Limited	1.81
5	Adam's Brown and Company Limited	1.79
6	Others via the NSE, USE & DSE	46.65
	Total	100.00

== Governance ==
The activities of the Holding Company (The Group), are supervised by an eight-person board of directors, led by Group chairman Zul Abdul.

== See also ==
- Nairobi Stock Exchange
- Uganda Securities Exchange
- Dar es Salaam Stock Exchange
