= Selebi-Phikwe =

- City
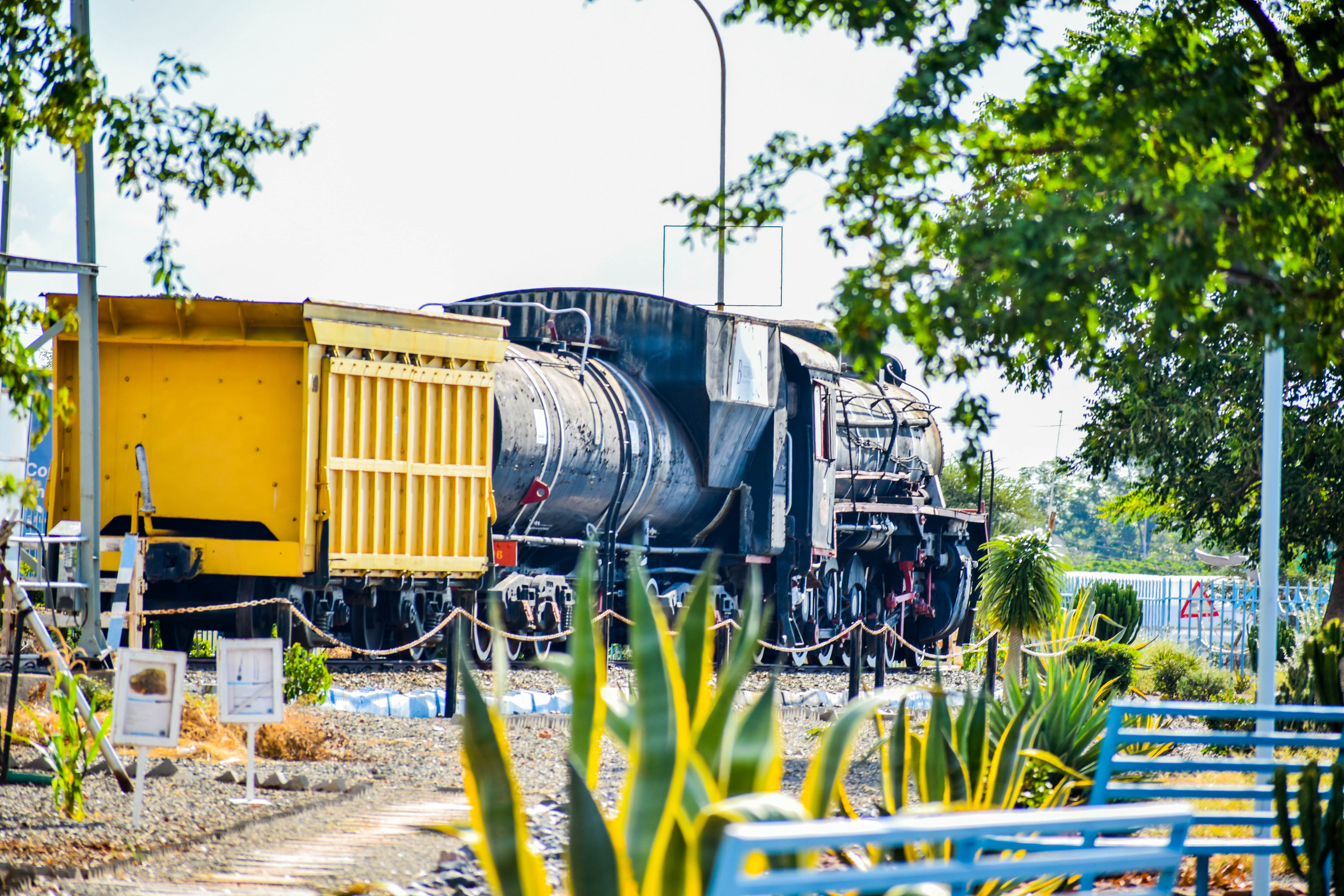
- Train monument in Selebi-Phikwe

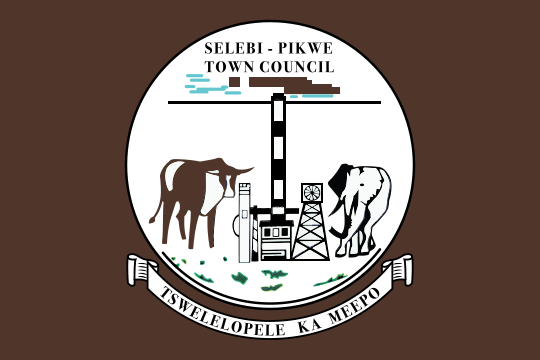
- Flag

- Location within Botswana
- Coordinates: 21°58′33″S 27°50′24″E
- Country: Botswana
- Elevation: 878 m (2,881 ft)

Population (2022)
  - Total: 42,488
- Time zone: UTC+2 (Central Africa Time)
  - Summer (DST): UTC+2 (not observed)
- ISO 3166 code: BW-CE
- Climate: BSh

Selebi-Phikwe (also spelt Selibe Phikwe) is a mining town located in the Central District of Botswana. It had a population of 42,488 in 2022. The town is an administrative district, separate from the surrounding Central District.

== Mining ==
Nickel mining commenced in 1973 and has been the main activity since. The complex includes a mine and a smelter. All operations are now deep mining. Originally there were two tiny places called Selebi and Phikwe, which straddled a large undiscovered deposit of copper and nickel in the area. When the mineral wealth of the area was discovered in the 1960s a mine and a township were built in the woodland between the places with the combined name of Selebi-Phikwe.

The main source of employment was the BCL Limited mine which excavated and smelted mixed copper-nickel ore from several shafts in deep and opencast mines. The opencast pit is now unused. Ore is transported from the shaft by rail for smelting. The locomotives used were steam-powered, having been bought from National Railways of Zimbabwe (NRZ) and South African Railways (SAR).

BCL only intended to stay in operation until 2010 and more recently 2013. It finally ceased operations in September 2016 putting thousands out of work.

== Government and infrastructure ==
The Botswana Prison Service (BPS) operates the Selebi-Phikwe Prison.

Phikwe Industrial Area provides premises for Factories and Business Houses as ancillary for the Mine. Construction companies include Watson, GSP, etc., SP Electricals, Britannia Backers, George Backers and Change and CO.

The town is also home to the Eastern Military Garrison run by the Botswana Defence Force.

Voice of America Botswana Shortwave Relay Facility: in 1991 the VOA inaugurated a shortwave transmitter at Moepeng Hill, about 20 km. from Selebi-Phikwe, a nickel and copper mining center. Owned jointly by the VOA and Radio Botswana, the station had operated on mediumwave since 1981.

== Energy ==
A small coal-fired power station was built along with the mine to meet the electricity needs of the mining operation and the surrounding area. Until the late 1980s, this was the only power station in Botswana. It was closed down some years ago when the Morupule Power Station began to produce power. Most of the electricity demand was met by importing electricity from South Africa. In the current situation of 'rationing' by the South African power supplier Eskom, Botswana suffers from power shortages.

In 2010, a private company ENERGY POINT (PTY) LTD, promoted by a foreign direct investor from India, started its operation of the Manufacturing of UPS, inverters, surge protectors etc. But the investor could not continue due to non compliance of BEDI and a government promise to provide basic infrastructure such as industrial land etc. Still, the company made a significant mark in this area giving most of the businesses and residences an uninterrupted power supply.

== Amenities and tourism ==
The town itself has a principal shopping mall, First Shopping Mall LESEDI shopping mall with ABC Bank and Barclays Extension Counter, Phikwe Square. There are five in-town hotels (Hotel Stonehouse, Hotel Selebi, Cresta Bosele, Syringa Lodge and Travel Inn), several guest houses and a number of serviced apartment complexes. The Phokoje Bush Lodge is about seven kilometres from town. The town has a small airport which only operates during daylight hours but does not have refuelling facilities. It has a technical college for artisan level training. A College of Applied Arts & Technology is being planned.

The town is on a tourist route from South Africa to the popular destinations of Okavango and Chobe. There is significant potential for birdwatching and fishing (bass and bream are well established but are not indigenous) at the Letsibogo Dam but, unfortunately, it is difficult to gain access to the dam due to rough terrain and necessity to camp on the shore. An experimental population of tigerfish (indigenous to the Limpopo basin) was introduced in 2009 which has proven that the environment would be suitable. The introduced population is thought to be insufficient for breeding. There are some local camp sites a few kilometres away from the dam. The water and wildlife at Letsibogo do not appear to have been negatively impacted by the pollution from BCL.

Selebi-Phikwe has seven government schools and across the town, Selebi Phikwe Senior Secondary School. Private schools include Kopano Primary, Morula Primary and Mount Pleasant Primary.

Selebi Phikwe hosts the biggest marathon in Botswana, the Phikwe Marathon; it was started by the late Boet Kahts and Phill Roberts who was a teacher at Selebi Phikwe Senior Secondary School in 1985 as a gesture of Community Service. The Marathon is classified as one of the best in the world by the International Association of Athletics Federations (IAAF). A report for SPEDU (Selebi Phikwe Economic Development), a local Regional Development Agency, suggests that there is significant potential for expansion of the marathon and also to apply the skills and experience gained by running that event for other events such as cross country cycling and quad biking and for bass fishing competitions at the Letsibogo Dam. The latter site also offers potential for bird watching and sailing if the infrastructure mentioned above were to be established.

== Notable people ==
- Shepard Mosekgwa (born 1976), Botswanan retired footballer
- Dumelang Saleshando (born 1971), Member of Parliament and Leader of the Opposition
