= Bujagali Falls =

Waterfall near Jinja, Uganda

Coordinates: 0°29′56″N 33°08′24″E

View of Bujagali Falls

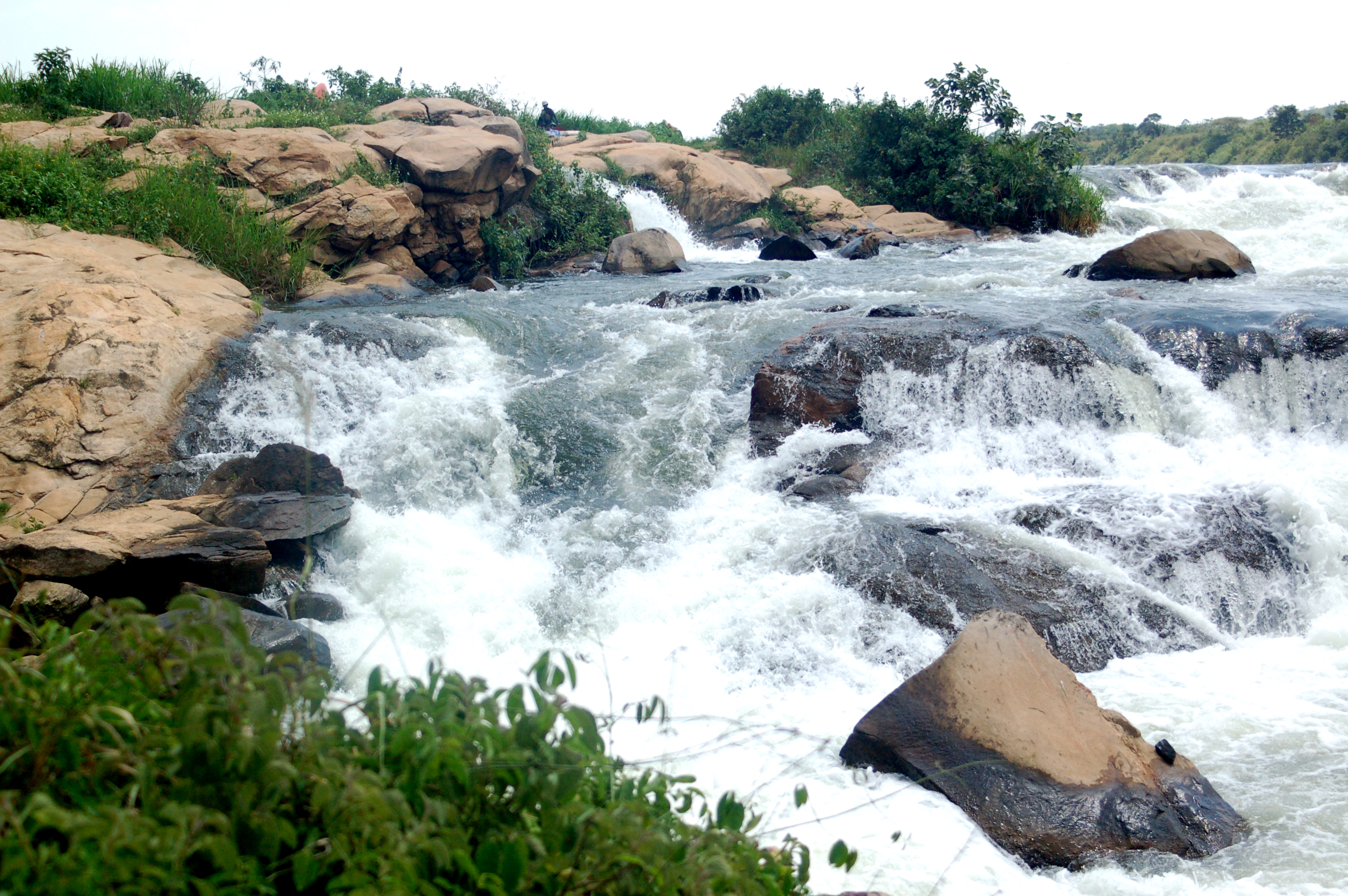
Rafting at Bujagali Falls, Uganda

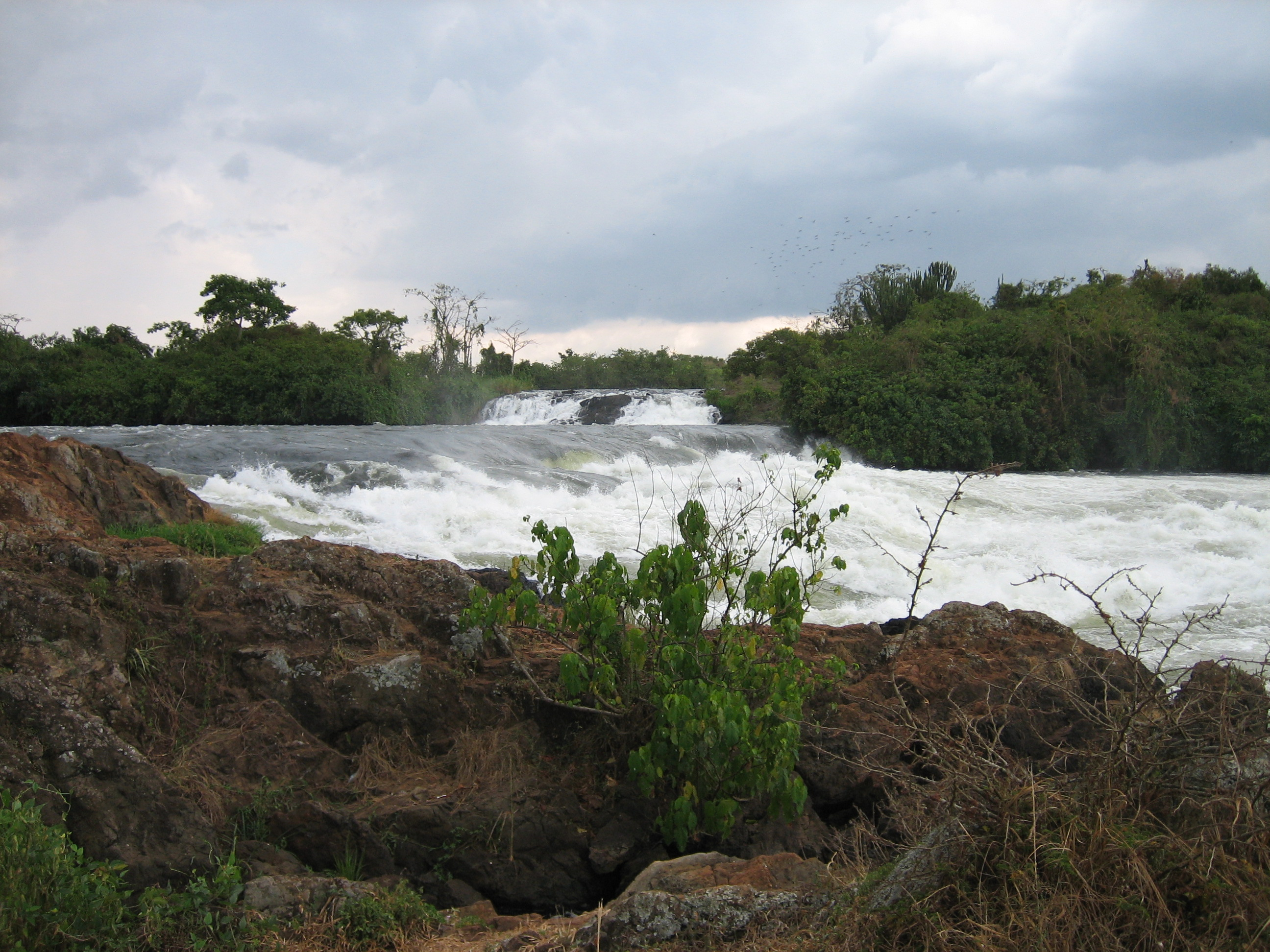
Front View of Bujagali Falls detail cascading

Bujagali Falls (also spelled Budhagali) was a waterfall near Jinja in Uganda where the Nile River comes out of Lake Victoria, sometimes considered the source of the Nile. Starting November 2011, the falls were submerged by the new Bujagali Power Station.

== Dam ==
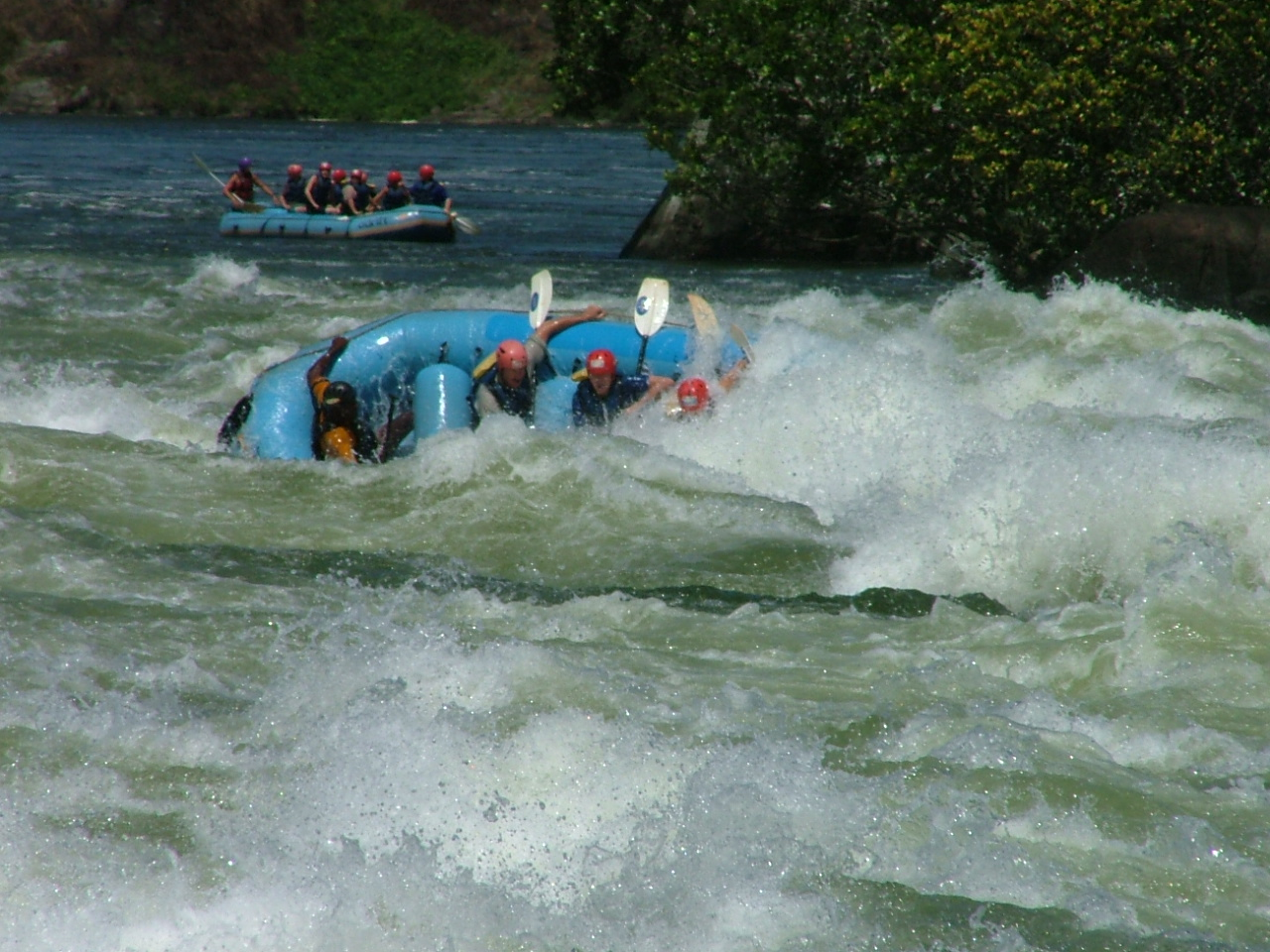
Rafters flipping in Bujagali Falls.

An acute electricity crisis impacted the livelihoods of millions of Ugandans and threatened the country's development. Hospitals, schools, businesses, and residences suffered daily power shortages, which have stunted Uganda's economic growth by an estimated one percent of the country's gross domestic product. The Bujagali project is a 200MW hydropower facility on the Victoria Nile in Uganda that will help address the country's energy crisis. The project supports Uganda's broader development strategy, which focuses in large part on improving the investment climate to promote growth and reduce poverty.

Others say the costly dam's power will not meet the needs of the vast majority of the country's population, will drown a sacred waterfall, and could do further harm to Lake Victoria, the world's largest tropical lake. Approximately 6,800 people will be directly affected by the creation of the dam.

== The Bujagali 'Spirit' ==
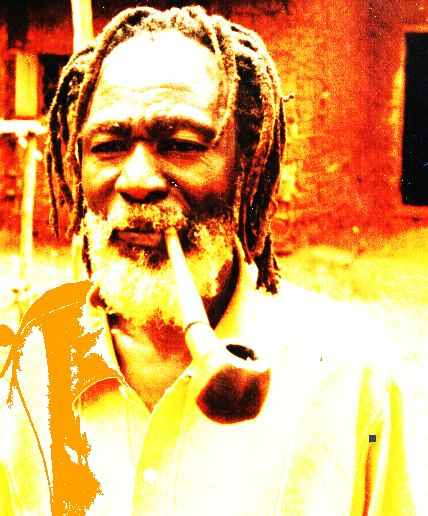
The Spirit of Bujagali

The falls are said by local residents to be the site of a spirit, called the "Spirit of Bujabald," who protects the community by performing rituals at the falls. The spirit is embodied in a man, Jjaajja Budhagali, who lives next to the falls; he is the thirty-ninth person to be the spirit.

== See also ==
- Bujagali Power Station
