= Phakalane =

Suburb of Gaborone, Botswana

Coordinates: 24.6464°S 25.9119°E

- Suburb/Neighbourhood
- Interactive map of Phakalane
- Country: Botswana
- Vehicle registration: B
- Website: www.phakalane.com

Phakalane is a suburb of Gaborone, the capital city of Botswana. It is a commercial and residential area 12.5 km north of the city center via the A1 road. The suburb is 16.3 km from the Sir Seretse Khama International Airport via the A1 road and Airport Road. Phakalane is part of the Gaborone North parliamentary constituency.

== Schools ==
- Phakalane English Medium Schools
- Toddlers Academy
