= Jubilee Insurance Company Limited =

Insurance company in Kenya

The Jubilee Insurance Company of Kenya
- Company type: Private
- Industry: Financial services
- Founded: 1937
- Headquarters: Nairobi, Kenya
- Key people: Zul Abdul; Chairman; Julius Kipngétich; Group CEO
- Products: Insurance
- Total assets: US$826.65 million (2015)
- Website: jubileeinsurance.com

The Jubilee Insurance Company of Kenya (JICK), mostly known as Jubilee Insurance, is an insurance company in Kenya, which has the largest economy in the East African Community. It is a wholly owned subsidiary of Jubilee Holdings Limited, a multinational insurance holding company, which maintains its headquarters in Nairobi, the capital of Kenya, with subsidiaries in Kenya, Tanzania, Uganda, Burundi, and Mauritius, with plans to expand on the African continent.

== History ==
Jubilee Insurance was incorporated as a Kenyan financial services provider with headquarters in the coastal city of Mombasa. The company prospered and over the years, opened offices in other East African cities and towns, including Nairobi, Dar-es-Salaam and Kampala. The company also opened branches in the Indian city of Bombay and Karachi, Pakistan. On the Indian Ocean islands of Mauritius and Zanzibar. The company's parent, Jubilee Holdings Limited, was listed on the Nairobi Stock Exchange (NSE) in 1973, where it trades under the symbol JUB.

Following a period of political and financial instability in the 1970s and 1980s in Uganda, The Jubilee Insurance Company of Uganda (JICU) re-established its presence in 1992. The Ugandan subsidiary is co-owned with the DFCU Group and with the Aga Khan Fund for Economic Development (AKFED). In 2006, Jubilee Holdings Limited became crosslisted on the Uganda Securities Exchange (USE).

In 1998, the company re-established a subsidiary in Tanzania. The Jubilee Insurance Company of Tanzania (JICT) is co-owned with local Tanzanian investors. It was the first privately owned insurance company to be licensed in the country, following the liberalisation of financial institutions ownership. Jubilee Holdings Limited became crosslisted on the Dar es Salaam Stock Exchange (DSE), also in 2006.

According to the Kenyan Insurance Regulatory Authority report released in September 2014, The Jubilee Insurance Company of Kenya was ranked first in market share with 11.9% of the Kenyan market ahead of Britam and CIC Insurance Group Limited, who controlled 11.2% and 9% respectively.

== Jubilee Holdings Limited ==
The following is a list of subsidiaries (50+% shareholding) of Jubilee Holdings Limited, who together form the Jubilee Group.

- The Jubilee Insurance Company of Kenya Limited (100%)
- The Jubilee Insurance Company of Uganda Limited (65%)
- The Jubilee Insurance Company of Tanzania Limited (51%)
- The Jubilee Insurance Company of Burundi S.A. (70%)
- Jubilee Insurance (Mauritius) Limited (80%)
- Jubilee Financial Services Limited (100%)
- Jubilee Investments Company Limited (Uganda) (100%)
- Jubilee Investments Tanzania Limited (100%)
- Jubilee Investments Burundi Limited (100%)
- Jubilee Center Burundi (80%)

The companies listed below are regarded as associate companies, with less than 50% shareholding of Jubilee Holdings Limited:

- PDM (Holdings) Limited (37.1%)
- IPS Cable Systems Limited (33.3%)
- FCL Holdings Limited (30.0%)
- IPS Power Investment Limited (27.0%)
- Bujagali Holding Power Company Limited (25.0%)
- Diamond Trust Bank Group (10.27%)

== Ownership ==
Jubilee Insurance Company Limited is a 100% subsidiary of Jubilee Holdings Limited, the "holding company" or the "parent". The stock of the holding company is listed on three of the four major stock exchanges in East Africa, namely the Nairobi Stock Exchange, the Uganda Securities Exchange and the Dar es Salaam Stock Exchange. As of December 2013, the total assets of the Parent were estimated at US$678 million (KES:61.16 billion), with shareholder's equity of approximately US$119 million (KES:10.7 billion).

== Kenya Branch Network ==
The company maintains the following offices in Kenya, as of 31 December 2013:

- Head Office – Jubilee Insurance House, Wabera Street, Nairobi County
- Mombasa Office – Third Floor, Jubilee Insurance Building, Moi Avenue, Mombasa County
- Kisumu Office – Third Floor, Jubilee Insurance House, Oginga Odinga Road, Kisumu
- Nairobi Agency Office 1 – Third Floor, Jubilee Exchange Building, Mama Ngina Street, Nairobi
- Nairobi Agency Office 2 – Ground Floor, Tulip House, Mombasa Road, Nairobi
- Nairobi Agency Office 3 – Sixth Floor, Wing B, Vanguard House, First Crossway Road, Chiromo Road, Westlands, Nairobi
- Nakuru Office – First Floor, Polo Centre, Kenyatta Avenue, Nakuru
- Nyeri Office – Third Floor, Sohan Plaza, Kimathi Way, Nyeri
- Kisii Office – Second Floor, New Sansora Building, Town Centre Hospital Road, Kisii
- Eldoret Office – Second Floor, Imperial Court Eldoret, Main Nairobi – Uganda Highway, Eldoret
- Meru Office – Second Floor, Alexander House, Moi Avenue, Meru
- Thika Office – Fourth Floor, Thika Arcade, Kenyatta Highway at Commercial Street, Thika
- Bungoma Office – First Floor, Bungoma Business Centre, Moi Avenue, Bungoma

== See also ==
- List of Insurance companies in Kenya
- Nairobi Stock Exchange
- Dar es Salaam Stock Exchange
- Uganda Securities Exchange
- Economy of Kenya
- List of insurance companies in Uganda
