= SN Power =

Defunct company

SN Power AS
- Formerly: Statkraft Norfund Power Invest AS
- Company type: Private
- Industry: Power
- Founded: 2002
- Defunct: 29 January 2021
- Fate: Acquired by Scatec
- Headquarters: Oslo, Norway
- Area served: Norway, Africa south of Sahara, Southeast Asia, Central America
- Key people: Erik Knive (CEO)
- Products: Hydroelectricity

SN Power is a defunct company that invests in clean, renewable energy on a commercial basis in emerging markets. SN Power was acquired by Scatec on 29 January 2021.

== History ==
The company was established in 2002. Along with Norfund, the Norwegian Investment Fund for Developing Countries, Statkraft created the international power company Statkraft Norfund Power Invest (in short called SN Power). The company was formed to promote economic growth and sustainable development in new and emerging markets. In May 2003, SN Power made its first investment, with the acquisition of 30 per cent of Nividhu in Sri Lanka, a venture partner that operates the power plants Assupiniella and Belihuloya.

SN Power AS was reestablished as a new company in 2013 after its parent company Statkraft and Norfund decided to make changes to their share portfolios.

On 27 September 2017 Statkraft and Norfund closed an agreement to swap shares in their jointly owned international hydropower assets. The agreement implies that Statkraft sells all its shares in SN Power to Norfund, while Norfund sells all its shares in Statkraft IH Invest AS (SKIHI) to Statkraft. Up until that date, Statkraft and Norfund owned 50 percent each in SN Power, which owns hydropower plants in Panama, Laos, Philippines and Zambia. At the same time Statkraft has owned 81.9% and Norfund 18.1% of the shares in SKIHI, the company owning mainly hydropower assets in Peru, Brazil, Chile, India and Nepal.

Through these transactions, Norfund increases its presence in Africa and Southeast Asia.

=== Ownership ===
The company was fully owned by Norfund, the Norwegian investment fund before being acquired by Scatec.

== Operations ==
The company has operations in Southeast Asia, Africa and Central America and the focus is to acquire, develop, construct and operate hydropower assets. SN Power has several running plants in the Philippines, Zambia, Laos, Uganda and Panama, and the company consist of a multinational team of people employed globally in its operations and projects. In addition to operating assets, SN Power has office in Netherlands and is headquartered in Oslo, Norway.
