= BCL Limited =

Mining company

BCL Limited, originally founded as Bamangwato Concessions Limited, was a mining company in Selebi-Phikwe in Botswana. It was formed in 1956 to mine copper.

In 1959, an agreement, signed by African Authority Rasebolai Kgamane, along with Seretse Khama and Oteng Mphoeng, allowed BCL to prospect. In 2004 the company changed its name to BCL Limited as parastatals in Botswana were separated from connections to tribes, Bamangwato being one of them.

Following lower market prices the mine was shut down in 2016, making over 5.000 people unemployed.
