= Palapye =

Town in Central District, Botswana

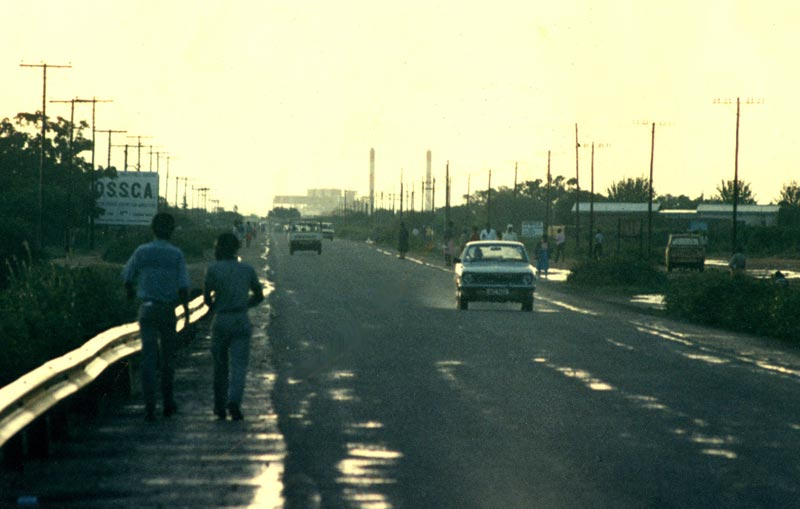
- Palapye in 1987
- Nickname: PY/Sphalabanyana/ Playtown
- Location of Palapye in Botswana
- Coordinates: 22°33′S 27°08′E
- Country: Botswana
- District: Central District
- Sub-District: Serowe/Palapye

Government
  - Member of Parliament (MP): Onneetse Ramogapi Preceded by member of Parliament (MP) Moiseraele Master Goya
  - Chief: Martha Lebang preceded by Chief Keetla Masogo
- Elevation: 919 m (3,015 ft)

Population (2021)
  - Total: 80,000
- Time zone: UTC+2 (Central Africa Time)
  - Summer (DST): UTC+2 (not observed)
- Area code: 49xxxxx
- Climate: BSh
- Website: http://www.palapye.com/

Palapye is a growing town in Botswana, situated about halfway between Francistown and Gaborone (170 km (106 mi) from Francistown and 240 km (149 mi) from Gaborone). Over the years its position has made it a convenient stopover on one of Southern Africa's principal north–south rail and road routes.

Located here is the Morupule Colliery, which supplies Morupule Power Station, Botswana's principal domestic source of electricity. The power station has undertaken an expansion project to increase its generation capacity in an effort to meet the country's increasing demand for electricity. Construction began in 2010. As of May 2021, Morupule A plant produces 132 MW of electricity, while Morupule B produces 600 MW.

In 1997 Palapye was said to be the fastest-growing village in Africa, and was expected to expand its population from 30,000 to 180,000.

== History ==
The Bamangwato people, under Kgosi Khama III, are widely believed to be the first people to have settled near present-day Palapye. Their capital was the settlement of Phalatswe, also called Old Palapye, and was situated at the western end of the Tswapong Hills. Palapye was originally spelled as Phalatswe, which meant the place for impalas.

It existed up to 1902, and the ruins of its church, built in 1892, are still to be seen a few kilometres from Palapye's town centre. Chief Khama contributed some 3,000 pounds to its construction and took a keen interest in church affairs. The Bamangwato people's houses were initially clustered around the church, but finding its vicinity too rocky, they moved 1.5 km (0.93 mi) from Gaborone and away.

The name Palapye, formerly rendered as Palachwe or Palapye, refers to the Impala antilope.

== Geography ==
Palapye is situated nearly 70 km (43 mi) north of the Tropic of Capricorn, by the Lotsane River, towards the central-eastern edge of Botswana.

Kgotla	Population
Serorome	10000
Boikago	5000
Madiba	6000
Lotsane	8000
Thomaditshotse	11000
Khurumela	13000
Boseja	3000
Morupule	2000
Mmaphula	15000
Rebaeng	2500
Kgaswe	900
Extension 1	
Extension 2	
Extension 3	
Extension 4	
Extension 5	
Extension 6	
Extension 7	
Extension 8	
Extension 9	
Extension 10	
Extension 11	

=== Climate ===
Summer months are from mid-September to mid-April. Summers are very hot in Palapye, with daytime temperatures reaching up to 40 °C. Thunderstorms are plentiful in the summer. Rainfall levels reach usually a minimum of 300 mm annually. Winters in Palapye are mild and dry.

== Demographics ==
Palapye's population is believed to be bordering the 80,000 mark, however, this is not an official figure, with many quarters arguing that the actual number is much higher or lower. According to 2022 2022 Population and Housing Census preliminary results, Palapye has registered 3.3% population growth rate from 2011 it was 37,256 and in 2022 is 52,398, Christianity is the main religious belief amongst Palapye citizens. However, there is considerable population of Muslim and Hindu believers in the town.

== Infrastructure and developments ==
The Palapye Water Affairs currently provides the town with an abundant supply of water. The works is located a few kilometres outside the town. The Affairs provides Serowe with water, through a new pipe network since 2008. Due to current blackouts across the country, resulting from South Africa's refusal to supply electricity to Botswana, construction has been halted for many projects. However, they have resumed, the most important project being the expansion of the Morupule Power Station. The Morupule Expansion Project 1, with an estimated budget of P1.5 billion, is expected to produce 3.8 million tonnes of coal.

Plans for a new hospital, similar to the newly constructed Serowe Hospital, have also been proposed. A new police station has been completed in 2012. It is located along the A1 Highway in the old industrial area.

From being a mere stop-over, Palapye is rapidly developing to one of Botswana's main financial, residential, industrial and educational hubs. New malls and educational institutions continue to mushroom gradually in Palapye. The town's physical size has more than doubled since the 1990s.

Palapye also has a professional recording studio, called Ruff Riddims, built in early 2009. It is the first of its kind in Palapye.

== Sport ==
The main sport played in Palapye is football, with many people also playing softball and volleyball. Sports are usually played at school grounds, which have adequate facilities and fields. Palapye has currently six known soccer teams, Palapye All Stars, Morupule Wanderers, FC Palapye, Palapye United and Palapye Swallows and Motlakase Power Dynamos. However, due to there being no stadium in the town, the three teams which usually played at Premier and First Division league usually play their matches elsewhere, although occasionally some games are played Palapye Swallows and PU Grounds. While in those leagues they play their matches in Orapa, Francistown, Sua, Maun or Selibe Phikwe.

== Education ==
Lotsane Senior Secondary School is one of the main government schools in Palapye. It accommodates learners from Forms 4 to 5. It is one of the very few boarding schools in the area and publishes a school newsletter called Lotsane.Other government schools in Palapye include Mabogo JSS, Palapye JSS and Mmaphula JSS. Popular private institutions in the town are; Kgaswe High School and Royal Professional College (which also offers tertiary level programmes). Also, there is a vocational institution that existed for over fifteen years in the town; Palapye Technical College (PATECO), formerly Palapye Vocational Technical College (VTC).

=== University ===
Since the year 2000, rumours circulated of a university to be built in Palapye. After numerous delays and extensive research, a project was finally accepted in 2004. BIUST (Botswana International University of Science and Technology) began construction of its campus in December 2009. The construction of the first phase of the university was expected to cost, close to P450 million. It was completed in late 2012, with the first students enrolled in August 2012. These first students, initial attended school in Oodi at Oodi College of Applied Arts and Technology whilst awaiting completion of the BIUST campus. The university was intended to help ease the burden on the University of Botswana, in the country's capital, Gaborone. The University of Botswana was struggling to meet the demand for an increased number of students. The BIUST Campus is situated on a 2,500 hectares (9.7 mi^{2}) site on the Tswapong Hills, south east of Palapye near the site of Palapye Water Affairs.

There is also a proposed plan by the University of Botswana to expand its Faculty of Medicine and locate it in Palapye.

== Transport ==
=== Road ===
Palapye lies on the main A1 Highway, which connects Botswana's two major cities, Gaborone and Francistown. There is a secondary road that leads to Serowe, and later, Orapa and Lethlakane.

=== Rail ===
The national railway, which connects all major towns and cities all over Botswana to each other, also passes through Palapye. The rail track through Palapye links the town to Gaborone and Francistown. Coal that is mined from other regions in Botswana, such as Selebi-Phikwe, is sent by rail to Palapye. A proposed rail link to Bulawayo, Zimbabwe has been touted to operate, but such plans are still to be considered by the government.

In 2008, proposals were made to build a new Trans-Kalahari Railway to a port in Namibia, but this is expected to begin construction in 2025.

=== Air ===
Palapye Airport is a small airfield located just outside the town.

An International Airport, that will be located on the Palapye-Serowe road, is another development that is being considered. If plans do go ahead for the proposed Palapye International Airport, it will be the country's fifth international airport, after Sir Seretse Khama International Airport in Gaborone, Francistown Airport, Maun Airport and Kasane Airport, easing the increased traffic that is currently being experienced at the present airports. However, such plans have been put on halt due to the current renovations and expansion at Gaborone Airport and a newly renovated Francistown Airport.

== Tourist attractions ==
There are several well-known tourist attractions close to Palapye. Khama Rhino Sanctuary, 15 km (9 mi) outside of neighbouring Serowe, is probably the best known and is some 50 km (31 mi) from Palapye. Here, there are endangered black and white rhino.

The Tswapong Hills also have many areas of historical significance and well as the Moremi Gorge, which is a gorge with a permanently flowing water source.

About 20 km (12 mi) ESE of Palapye, close to the village of Malaka, are the remains of Phalatswe, also called Old Palapye, the capital of the Bamangwato people under Khama III from 1889 to 1902.
