= Scatec =

Norwegian renewable energy systems company

Scatec ASA
- Type: Allmennaksjeselskap
- Traded as: OSE: SCATC
- Industry: Renewable electricity
- Founded: 2007
- Headquarters: Oslo, Norway
- Number of employees: 126 (2026)
- Website: scatec.com

Scatec ASA, formerly Scatec Solar ASA is a Norwegian company which specializes in renewable energy systems. The company was founded by Dr. Alf Bjørseth in 2007. The two major shareholders of the company are Scatec Innovation AS and Equinor. In November 2020, the company changed its name to Scatec ASA to reflect its broadened strategy going from solar company to renewable company.

It is headquartered in Oslo, Norway, and the company has offices in Germany, Czech Republic, Italy, France, The Netherlands, United States, South Africa and India. The company has also invested in solar energy projects in Ukraine.

From 2007 to 2020, the company specialised in developing, constructing, owning and operating large scale photovoltaic systems in emerging markets. The company has on several occasions partnered with the Norwegian government to complete projects. In 2020, Scatec Solar acquired SN Power from Norfund, reflecting the company's broadened strategy of including hydropower, windpower, floating solar and energy storage systems in its portfolio.

== COVID-19 superspreader event ==
On 26 November 2021, Scatec ASA held a Christmas party in Oslo, Norway attended by 120 people, all of whom were fully vaccinated against COVID-19 and tested negative for COVID-19 prior to the party being held. One person who attended the party had recently returned from South Africa, the epicenter of the SARS-CoV-2 Omicron variant outbreak and a country where the company has a solar panel project. It was later found that the attendee from South Africa had been infected with the Omicron variant. More than half of the party's attendees have since tested positive for COVID-19 and of those attendees, at least 13 of them were confirmed to have the variant.
