= Botswana Power Corporation =

- Type: Public utility
- Industry: Energy industry
- Headquarters: Motlakase House, Macheng Way, Gaborone, Botswana
- Services: Electricity
- Revenue: 3,398,553,000 Botswana pula (2020)
- Operating income: ▲BWP129.379 million (2020); BWP117.511 million (2019)
- Total assets: ▼BWP2.662 billion (2020); BWP1.495 billion (2019)
- Total equity: ▲BWP10.540 billion (2020); BWP10.784 billion (2019)
- Number of employees: ▲2177 (2020); 1870 (2019)
- Parent: Government of Botswana
- Website: www.bpc.bw

Botswana Power Corporation (BPC) is a state-owned company for electrical power generation, transmission and distribution in Botswana. It was established in 1970 and is currently the only electricity supplier in the country. BPC represents Botswana in the Southern African Power Pool. Morupule Power Station (coal-fired) in Palapye supplies 80% of domestically generated electricity, however the country is dependent on importing energy from its neighbours. Its capacity is estimated to be around 132 MW. The region's main power supplier, South Africa, is experiencing its own problems with under-capacity blackouts. A plan to boost Morupule station with four new 150 MW units is underway and gathering financial support from several sources.

== History ==
Botswana Power Corporation was formed in 1970 after the Botswana Parliament passed the Botswana Power Corporation Act. BPC produced an estimated 1,052 GWh in 2007, while demand was estimated to 2,648 GWh.

== Capacity ==
Total electricity produced locally by BPC;

Plant name	Type	Output
Morupule A	Thermal	132MW
Morupule B	Thermal	600MW
Matshelagabedi (Emergency Plant)	Diesel	70MW
Orapa (Emergency Plant)	Diesel	90MW
Phakalane Solar Station	Solar	1.3MW

== See also ==
- Botswana Power Corporation Workers' Union
- Water Utilities Corporation
- Botswana Communications Regulatory Authority
