= Kazungula (disambiguation) =

Kazungula may refer to one of three adjacent places on the Zambezi river in central Africa:

- Kazungula, Botswana
- Kazungula, Zambia
- Kazungula, Zimbabwe

It may also refer to:

- the Kazungula District of Zambia
- Kazungula Bridge
- Kazungula Ferry
