= M10 road (Zambia) =

Road in Zambia

M10 Road

Route information
- Length: 508 km (316 mi)

Major junctions
- East end: T1 in Livingstone
- M19/ A33 (Kazungula Bridge) to Botswana at Kazungula; B8 to Namibia near Katima Mulilo Bridge
- West end: M9 in Mongu

Location
- Country: Zambia
- Provinces: Southern, Western
- Major cities: Livingstone, Sesheke, Senanga, Mongu

Highway system
- Transport in Zambia
← M9	→ M11

The M10 road is a road in Zambia. It goes from Livingstone, through Sesheke and Senanga, to Mongu. The road is approximately 508 kilometres long and follows the Zambezi River for its entire length.

The M10 between Livingstone and Kazungula (where there is a narrow border to Botswana) and extending further west to Sesheke (where there is a border to Namibia's Caprivi Strip) is a major route used by motorists for international trade and travelling between Zambian cities and the respective countries of Botswana, Namibia and South Africa. The road is one lane in each direction. As a result, the road may be very busy and may have high volumes of traffic in either direction.

The M10 between Livingstone and Sesheke (Katima Mulilo) is part of the Walvis Bay-Ndola-Lubumbashi Development Road.

== Route ==
The M10 route begins in Livingstone (just south of the city centre), at an intersection with the T1 road (Lusaka-Livingstone Road; with access to Victoria Falls and north-western Zimbabwe in the south and northern, central and eastern Zambia in the north-east).

The road goes west as Nakatindi Road, being the road separating the Dambwa North and Dambwa Central suburbs of Livingstone. The road goes for 70 kilometres, though the north-western section of the Mosi-oa-Tunya National Park, to the small town of Kazungula, where there is a narrow border with Botswana on the Zambezi River (currently crossed using the Kazungula Bridge; previously by the Kazungula Ferry) (The 3-kilometre stretch of road from the M10 to the Kazungula Bridge is known as the M19 road on Zambia's network and the road on the other side of the border is known as the A33 road of Botswana).

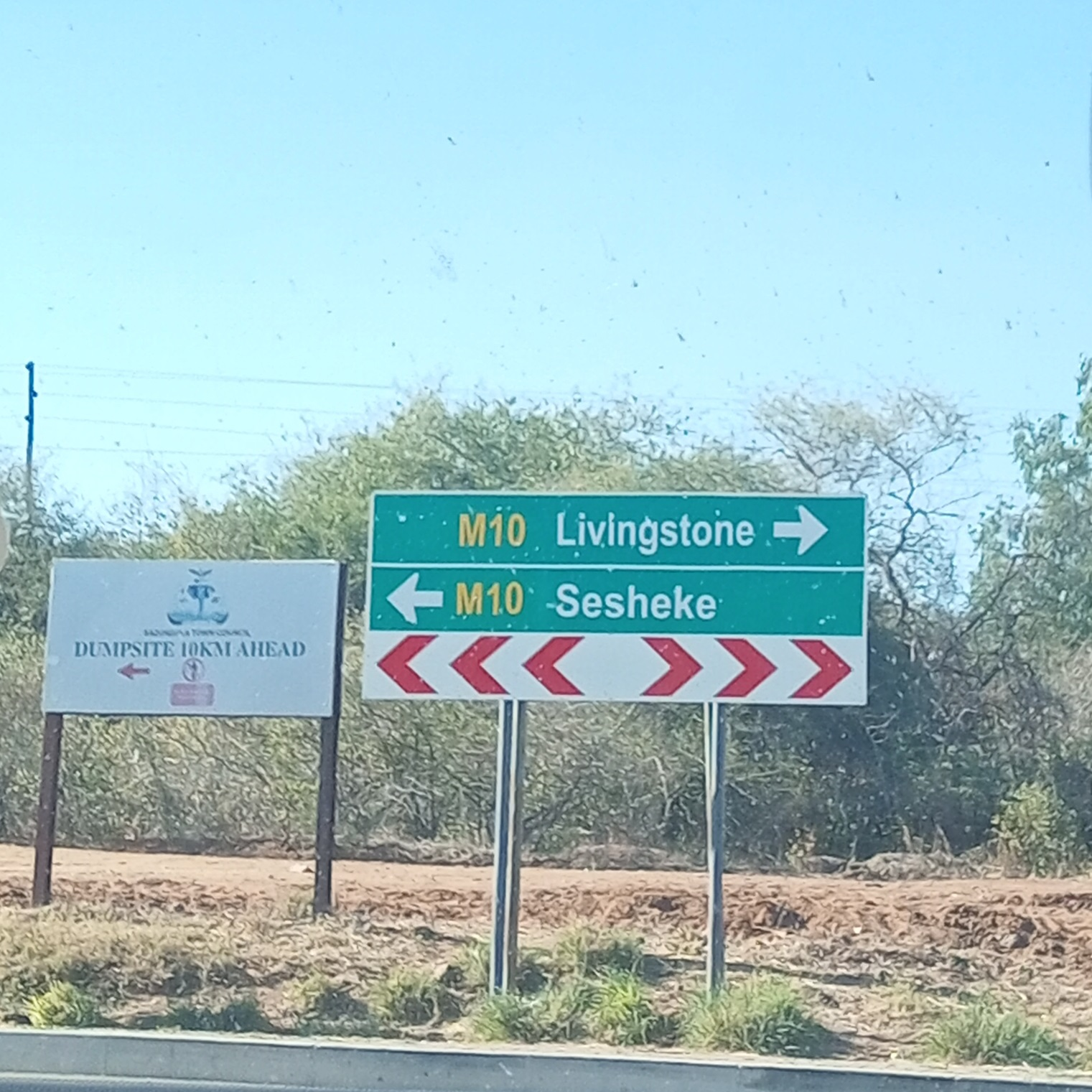
A road sign at the junction of the M10 and M19 in Kazungula.

Global positioning systems suggest that the route through Kazungula and Eastern Botswana is a quicker route to Johannesburg, South Africa from Livingstone than through Victoria Falls and Zimbabwe as of December 2023. The M10 road is also on the main route between Botswana and Lusaka (Zambia's capital city) and countries like DR Congo and Malawi. As a result, the route is important for international trade and may be busy in either direction.

From the small town of Kazungula, the M10 road continues west for 135 kilometres, crossing into the Western Province, bypassing the town of Mwandi, to the town of Sesheke. Just before Mwandi, by Simungoma Market (40 kilometres before Sesheke), is a junction with the D787, which goes north to the town of Mulobezi (95 kilometres away), where there is a timber industry.

The M10 is the main road through Sesheke Central. 3 kilometres west of Sesheke, at a junction with the RD325 road, at the point where the Zambezi River stops being a national borderline and turns northwards, the M10 road crosses in a south-westerly direction as the Katima Mulilo Bridge (completed in 2004) to be on the western side of the Zambezi River, before meeting the Namibia (Katima Mulilo) Border Post.

Just after crossing the Zambezi River, there is a road south into Namibia's Caprivi Strip, connecting to Namibia's B8 road (part of the Walvis Bay-Ndola-Lubumbashi Development Road) (the border on the Namibian side is named Wenela Border Post). The Katima Mulilo Bridge (completed in 2004), connecting Sesheke with the western side of the Zambezi River, completes a much-needed road link between Zambia and Namibia. As the main link between cities in Namibia like Walvis Bay and cities in Malawi, DR Congo, Tanzania and Zambia, the road is important for international trade and may be used frequently by motorists in either direction.

The M10 between Kazungula and Sesheke is a road with a reputation of being in a very poor condition, with many motorists choosing to use different routes between Kazungula and Namibia (like commuting through Kasane and the northern area of the Chobe National Park, both in Botswana, to enter Namibia at Ngoma).

From the Namibia Border, the M10 turns to the north-north-west and heads for 116 km to a point south of the town of Sioma. Just before Sioma is the Ngonye Falls, also known as the Sioma Falls, on the Zambezi River. The M10 road crosses back to the eastern side of the Zambezi River as the Sioma Bridge and continues north for 85 kilometres, through the Lui Toll Plaza, to the town of Senanga, which is near the southern point of the Barotse Floodplain. It passes through the eastern suburbs.

From Senanga, the M10 road goes north for 100 km to the town of Mongu, which is the capital of the Western Province and Barotseland. The M10 ends at an intersection with the M9 road from Lusaka at a roundabout in Mongu Central (adjacent to Barotse Shopping Mall).

== M19 Road (Zambia) ==
M19 Road

Route information
- Length: 3 km (1.9 mi)

Major junctions
- North end: M10 in Kazungula
- South end: A33 at Kazungula Bridge border with Botswana

Location
- Country: Zambia
- Provinces: Southern
- Major cities: Kazungula

Highway system
- Transport in Zambia
← M18	→ M20

On Zambia's road network, the M19 is designated as the short 3-kilometre road through Kazungula, from the junction with the M10 southwards to the Kazungula Bridge on the Zambezi River, where it crosses the river into the nation of Botswana. It becomes the A33 road of Botswana to Kasane and Nata on the other side of the river. The border area on the other side of the river crossing is also named Kazungula.

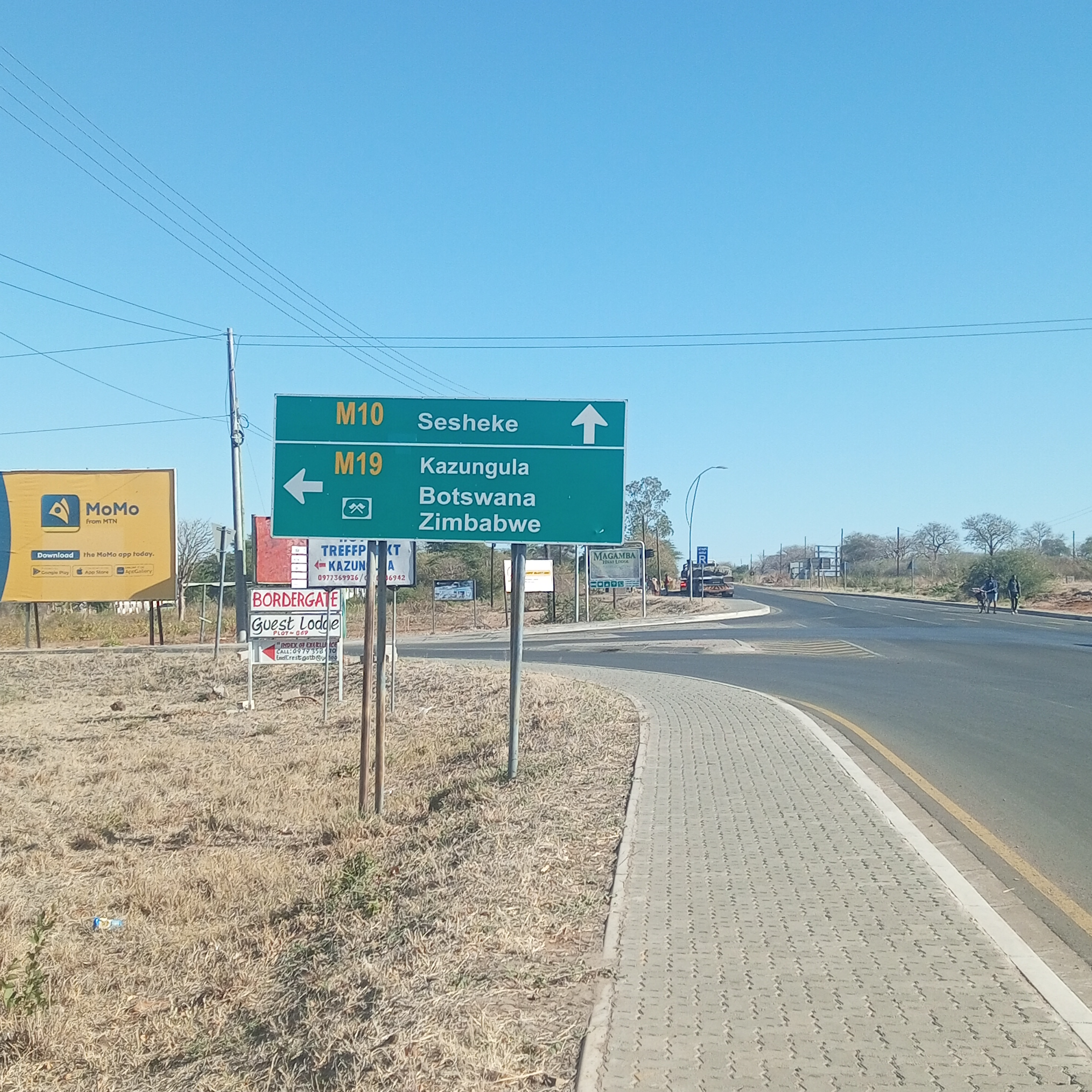
A road sign at the junction of the M10 and M19 in Kazungula.

Construction of the Kazungula Bridge and the one-stop border post to connect the M19 and A33 roads (replacing the Kazungula Ferry) was started in December 2014, with the bridge deal given to Daewoo Engineering & Construction by the Zambia and Botswana governments in September 2014. After construction ended in December 2020, the bridge was opened on 10 May 2021.

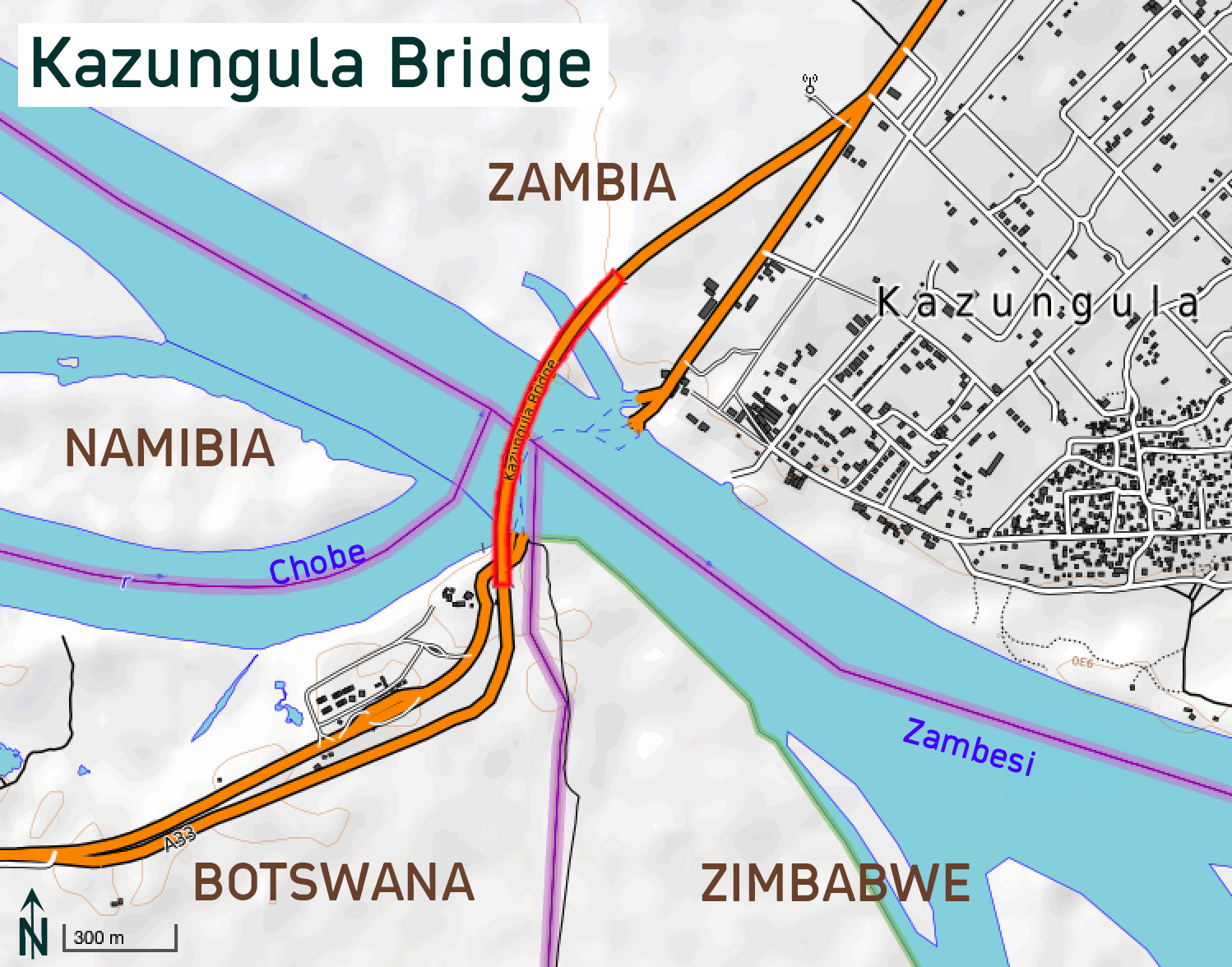
Map of the Kazungula Bridge connecting the A33 at Kazungula, Botswana and the M19 at Kazungula, Zambia

== See also ==
- Roads in Zambia
