= Kazungula Ferry =

Pontoon ferry across the Zambezi River

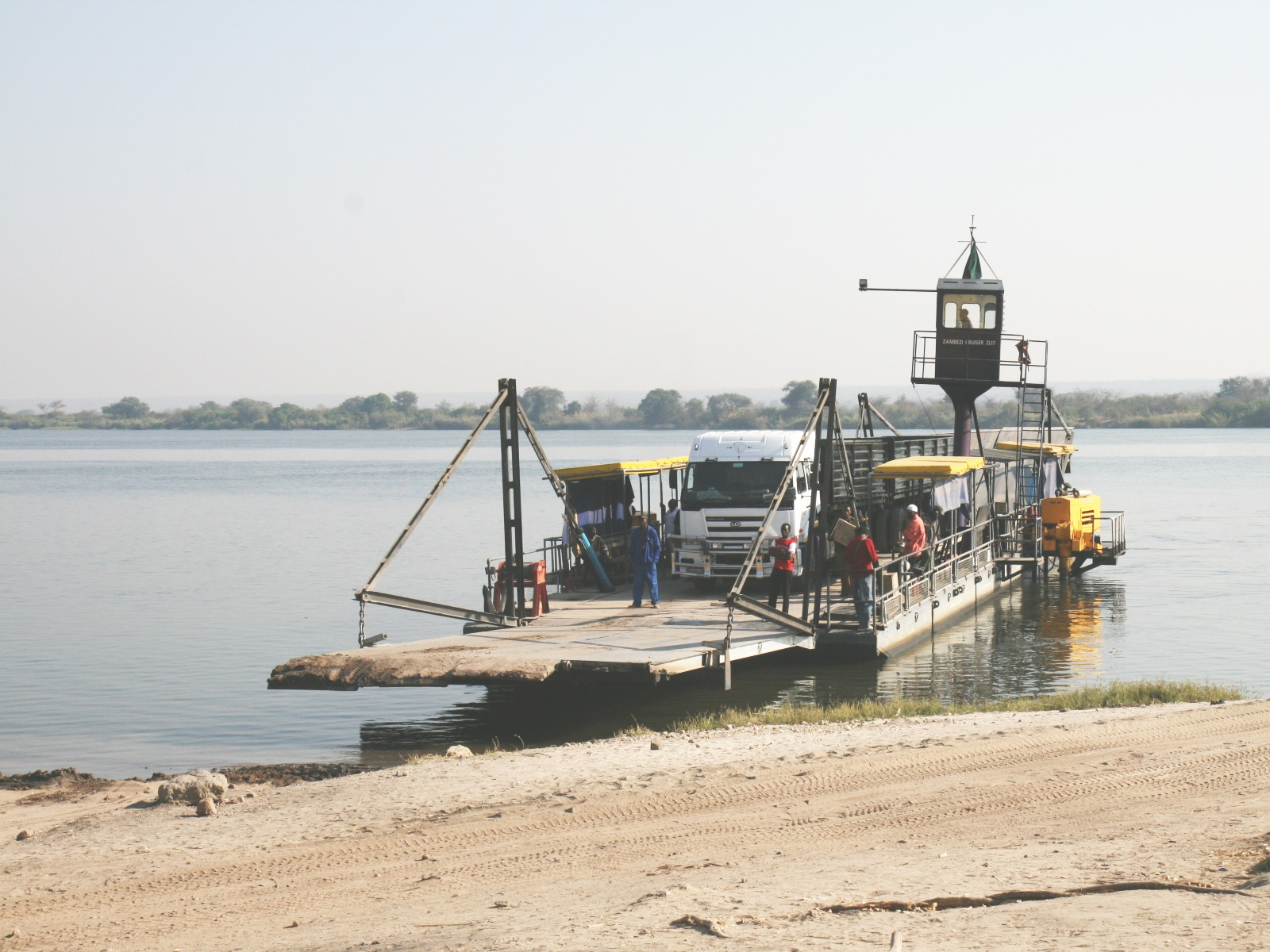
One of the two pontoon ferries that cross the Zambezi at Kazungula

The Kazungula Ferry was a pontoon ferry across the 400-metre-wide (1,300 ft) Zambezi River between Botswana and Zambia. It was one of the largest ferries in south-central Africa, having a capacity of 70 tonnes (69 long tons; 77 short tons). The service was provided by two motorised pontoons and operated between border posts at Kazungula, Zambia and Kazungula, Botswana.

It linked the Livingstone-Sesheke road (M10 road; which connects to the Trans–Caprivi Highway at Katima Mulilo and forms part of the Walvis Bay Corridor) to the main north–south highway of Botswana through Francistown and Gaborone to South Africa, and also to the Kasane-Victoria Falls road through Zimbabwe. It served the international road traffic of three countries directly (Zambia, Zimbabwe and Botswana) and of three more indirectly (Namibia, South Africa and DR Congo).

Whether Botswana and Zambia actually shared a common border, or whether the ferry was illegally crossing into Namibian or Rhodesian territory, was the subject of dispute. In 1970, South Africa (which at the time occupied Namibia) informed Botswana that there was no common border between Botswana and Zambia, claiming that a quadripoint existed. As a result, South Africa claimed, the Kazungula Ferry, which links Botswana and Zambia at the quadripoint, was illegal. Botswana firmly rejected both claims. There was actually a confrontation and shots were fired at the ferry; some years later, the Rhodesian Army attacked and sank the ferry, maintaining that it was serving military purposes.

In 2003 the ferry was the site of a disaster when a severely overloaded Zambian truck capsized one of the pontoons and 18 people drowned. The accident was blamed on the lack of weighbridges in Zambia at the time to check the weight of trucks.

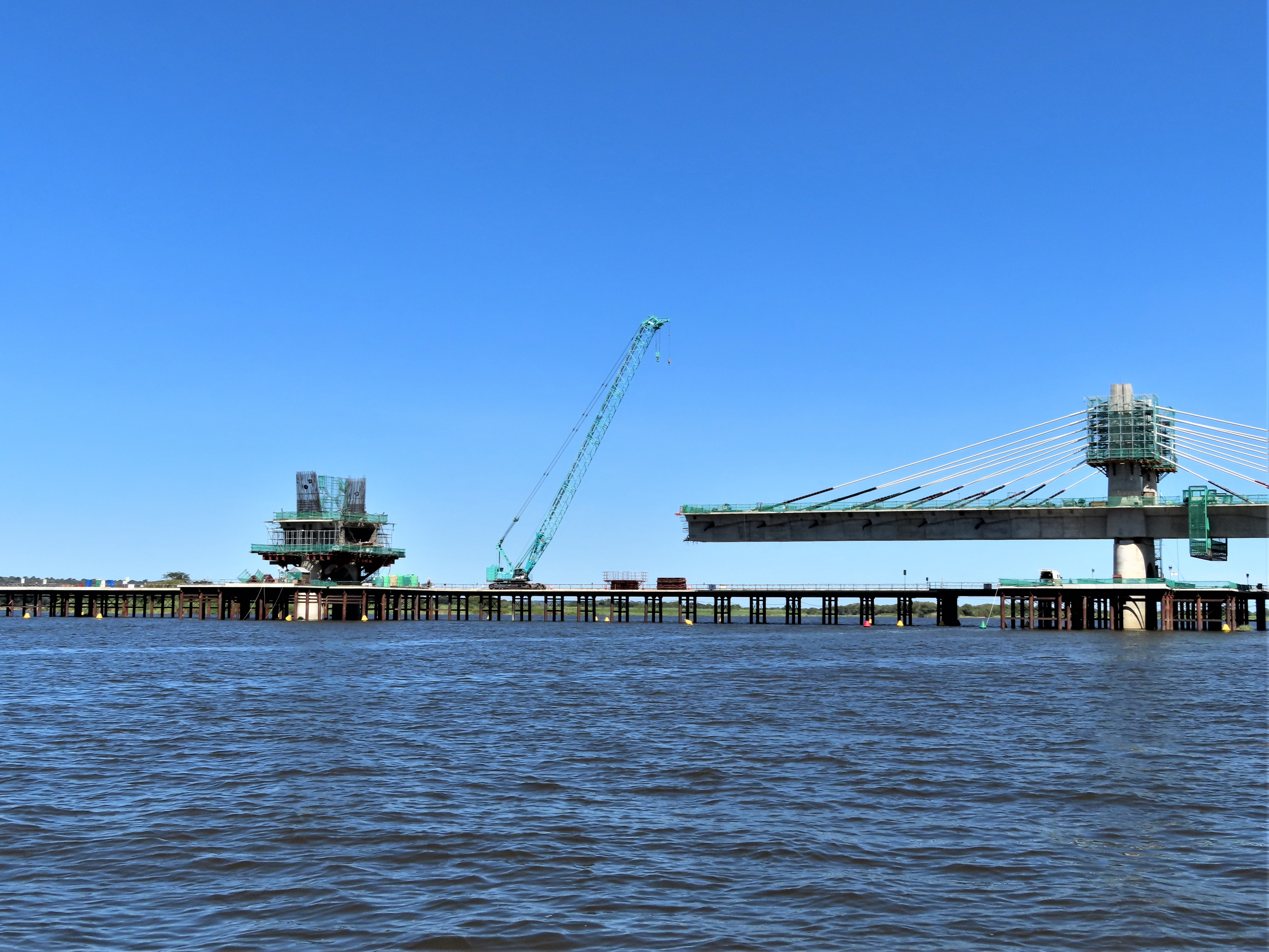
The bridge under construction, March 2019

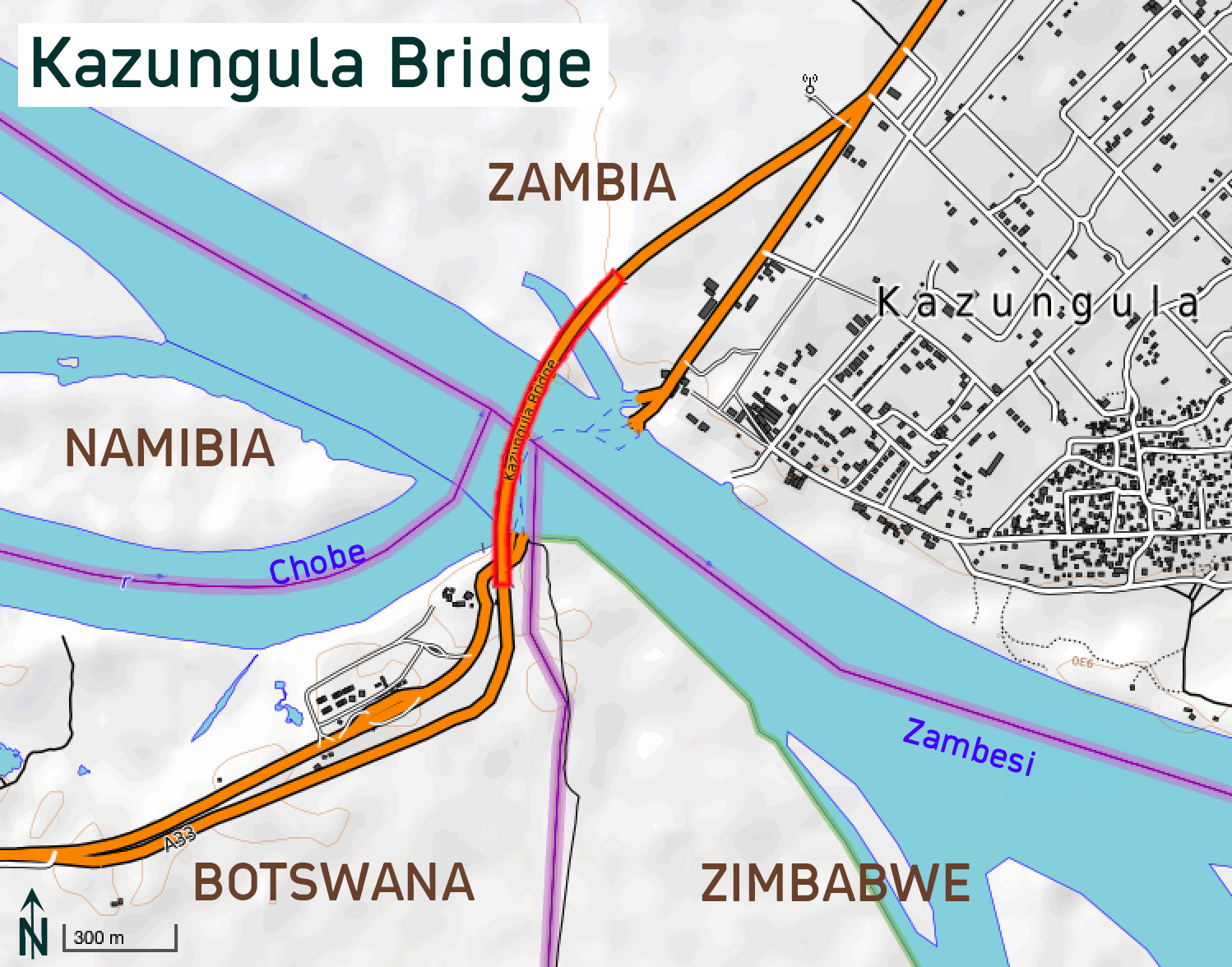
Map of the Kazungula Bridge in relation to the Kazungula, Botswana (southwest) and Kazungula, Zambia (northeast)

In August 2007, the governments of Zambia and Botswana announced a deal to construct the Kazungula Bridge at the site to replace the ferry. The existence of a short boundary of about 150 metres (490 ft) between Zambia and Botswana was apparently agreed to during various meetings involving heads of state and/or officials from all four states in the 2006-10 period and is clearly shown in the African Development Fund project map. This matches the US Department of State Office of the Geographer depiction in Google Earth. The planned route for the new bridge crosses this boundary without entering Zimbabwe or Namibia.

Construction of the bridge started in December 2014 and it was officially opened on 10 May 2021 to replace the ferry.

== See also ==
- Kazungula
- Kazungula Bridge
