= Walvis Bay-Ndola-Lubumbashi Development Road =

Road in Southern Africa

Trans-Caprivi highway
- Corridors in Namibia

Route information
- Length: 2,700 km (1,700 mi)

Location
- Country: Namibia

Highway system
- Transport in Namibia

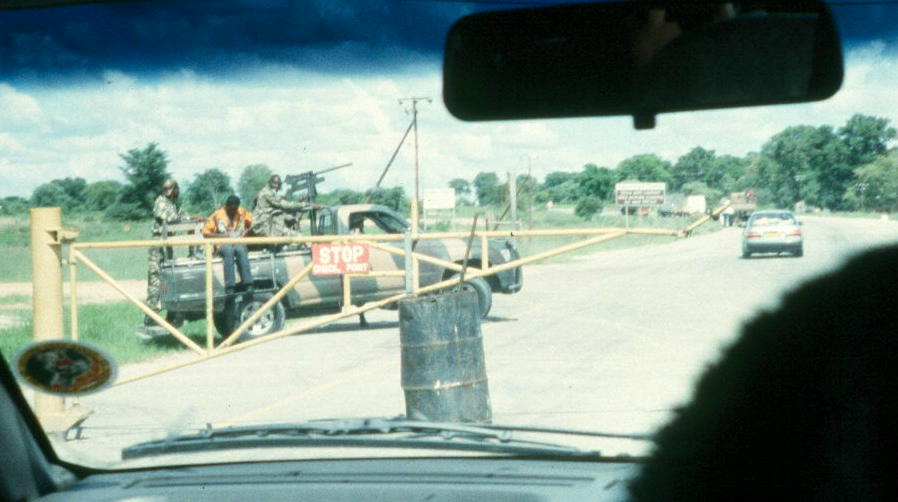
Namibian military escort through the Caprivi Strip.

The Walvis Bay-Ndola-Lubumbashi Development Road, formerly known as the Trans-Caprivi Corridor and until 2004 the Trans-Caprivi Highway, begins in Walvis Bay. It runs through Rundu in northeastern Namibia and along the Caprivi Strip to Katima Mulilo on the Zambezi River, which forms the border between Namibia and Zambia. The Katima Mulilo Bridge spans the river to the Zambian town of Sesheke. From there, the road continues as the M10 Road to Livingstone, where it connects to the main north–south highway to Lusaka and extends to the Copperbelt.

The Trans-Caprivi highway is a section of the Walvis Bay Corridor, a trade route linking land-locked Zambia (and neighbouring countries such as DR Congo, Malawi and Zimbabwe) to the Walvis Bay port on the Atlantic Ocean. An example of the function of the corridor as a trade route is that trucks carry copper ore concentrate from the Dikulushi Mine in South-East DR Congo across Zambia and down the Trans-Caprivi highway to the copper smelter at Tsumeb in Namibia. The refined copper is then exported from Namibian ports.

== Route ==
As the name suggests, the corridor starts at Walvis Bay (in Namibia), passes through Ndola (in Zambia) and ends at Lubumbashi (in DR Congo).

The corridor begins in the coastal town of Walvis Bay as the B2 road, heading northwards to the coastal town of Swakopmund (a distance of 35km), where it turns eastwards. It heads eastwards from Swakopmund, through Karibib, to the town of Okahandja (a distance of 290km), where it reaches a junction with the B1 road. At this junction, the B2 ends and the corridor becomes the B1 northwards. The entire section from Walvis Bay to Okahandja is shared with the Trans-Kalahari Corridor.

From Okahandja, it heads northwards as the B1 for 290km, through Otjiwarongo, to the town of Otavi (south-west of Tsumeb), where it reaches a junction with the B8 road. At this junction, the corridor becomes the B8 east-north-east and heads for 345km to the town of Rundu, where it meets the B10 road and becomes the main road through the Caprivi Strip. The section from Okahandja to Otavi is shared with the Tripoli–Cape Town Highway.

The corridor resumes being the B8 road and heads eastwards from Rundu for 510km to the border town of Katima Mulilo, where it crosses the national boundary in a northerly direction to enter Zambia. Immediately after crossing the border, it reaches a junction with Zambia's M10 road. The corridor becomes the M10 and immediately crosses the Zambezi River in a north-easterly direction as the Katima Mulilo Bridge to enter the town of Sesheke.

From Sesheke, the corridor heads eastwards as the M10 for 135km to the small town of Kazungula, where it meets the M19 road (which provides access to the near Kazungula Bridge border with Botswana). From Kazungula, it heads eastwards for 70 kilometres as the M10 to the city of Livingstone (10 km north of the Victoria Falls), where it reaches a junction with the T1 road. At this junction, the M10 ends and the corridor becomes the T1 north-eastwards.

From Livingstone, it heads north-east as the T1 for 420km, through Choma, to reach a junction with the T2 road about 10km south of Kafue. At this junction, the T1 ends and the corridor becomes the T2 northwards. It heads northwards as the T2 for 55km to the city of Lusaka (capital city of Zambia). From Lusaka, it heads northwards as the T2 for 200km, through Kabwe, to Kapiri Mposhi, where it reaches a junction with the T3 road and enters the Copperbelt region. At this junction, the corridor becomes the T3 northwards. The section from Livingstone to Kapiri Mposhi is shared with the Cairo-Cape Town Highway.

From Kapiri Mposhi, it heads northwards as the T3 for 170km, through the city of Ndola, to the city of Kitwe. From Kitwe, it heads northwards for 90km, through Chingola, to the border town of Kasumbalesa, where it crosses the national boundary in a northerly direction to enter DR Congo and become the N1 route. From Kasumbalesa, the corridor heads north-north-west as the N1 route for 100 kilometres to the city of Lubumbashi. The section from Kafue (south of Lusaka) to Lubumbashi is shared with the Beira–Lobito Highway.

== See also ==
- Trans-African Highway network
