= Mwandi =

- Town
- Location in Zambia
- Coordinates: 17°31′00″S 24°49′30″E
- Country: Zambia
- Province: Western Province
- District: Mwandi District
- Time zone: UTC+2 (CAT)

Mwandi is a small town on the Zambezi in the district of the same name of the Western Province in Zambia. The town is 120 km west of Livingstone, on the M10 Road to Sesheke. The village is part of the region known as Barotseland. The town is the seat of a parliamentary constituency of the same name.

== Etymology ==
Mwandi means "plenty of fish" in the Silozi language.

== Religion ==
The United Church of Zambia maintains a large mission at Mwandi. In addition, local traditional tribal beliefs continue to be practised.

== Facilities ==
The hospital is the Mwandi Mission Hospital, which is listed as a Level 2 Hospital by the Zambian Ministry of Health. The hospital is one of the village's largest employers. The village is close to the Shackleton Tiger Fishing Lodge, a popular tourist destination for fishing for tigerfish named after Robert Millner Shackleton.

== Population ==
Approximately 8,000 people live in the village proper. They are semi-nomadic cattle herders and fishermen. Infrastructure is poor, and electricity and clean water are not readily available, though recent development efforts have begun to change that. Most people live on less than $1.00 per day. The people are largely of the Lozi ethnicity, though there are also some people here of European descent. The area around the village includes anywhere from 25,000 to 33,000 people.

== Culture ==
The village is a centre of traditional Barotse culture, housing the Kuta council, which adjudicates disputes and legislates on issues related to the tribal people of Sesheke District.

== Health ==
Mwandi, like all of Sesheke District, is in an area with a very high (>300/1000) incidence of malaria. As road infrastructure has improved, HIV has also spread to the village. The village is the site of a large health centre (the Mwandi Mission Hospital) which serves both its people, and the surrounding area. Average life expectancy as estimated by the United Nations is 59 years.

== Notable individuals from Mwandi ==
- Chief Inyambo Yeta IV of the Barotse Royal Establishment
- Dan Van Zyl, co-director of the Home for AIDS Orphans, a registered nonprofit which provides a variety of services in Mwandi
