= Kazungula =

Border town in Zambia

- Town
- Location in Zambia
- Coordinates: 17°47′S 25°16′E
- Country: Zambia
- Province: Southern Province
- District: Kazungula District

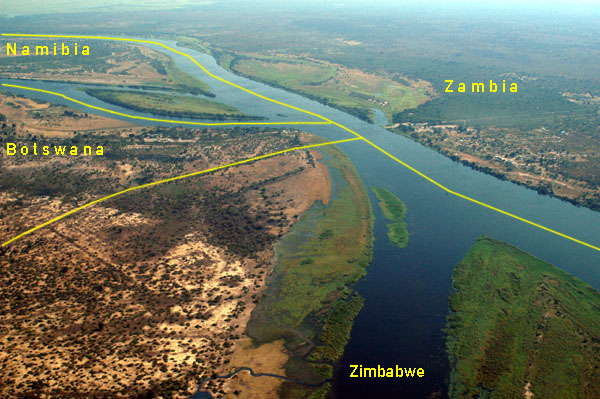
Kazungula (centre right) on the Zambezi River, before the construction of the bridge. Zambia is on the right; Namibia at the top on the left; Botswana in the middle on the left and Zimbabwe bottom all the way across the bottom of the picture. The Zimbabwe–Botswana border runs only just this side of the ferry pier.

Kazungula is a border town in Zambia, lying on the north bank of the Zambezi River about 70 kilometres (45 mi) west of Livingstone on the M10 road.

At Kazungula, the territories of four countries (Zambia, Botswana, Zimbabwe, and Namibia) come close to meeting at a quadripoint. It has now been agreed that the international boundaries contain two tripoints joined by a short line roughly 135 metres (443 ft) long forming a boundary between Zambia and Botswana, now crossed by the Kazungula Bridge. The ever-shifting river channels and the lack of any agreements addressing the issue before 2000 led to some uncertainty in the past as to whether or not a quadripoint legally existed. Thus, Botswana and Zambia share a border of about 135 metres (443 ft) at the confluence of the Chobe River (which divides Namibia and Botswana) and the Zambezi River between Kakumba (or Xakumba) Island, the extreme tip of Namibia's Caprivi Strip, and Zimbabwe's westernmost point.

Kazungula is also the name of the border town in Botswana on the other side of the Zambezi. Both towns are important trade transit points for Zambia and Botswana. Kazungula, Botswana also has a border crossing into Zimbabwe, with a sealed highway to the town of Victoria Falls.

== Transport ==
=== Kazungula Bridge ===
This major road and rail bridge over the Zambezi river opened for traffic on 10 May 2021, replacing the Kazungula Ferry, which was one of the largest ferries in the region with a capacity of 70 tonnes (69 long tons; 77 short tons).The bridge crosses the 400 m (1,300 ft) wide Zambezi river from Kazungula in Zambia to the eponymous village of Kazungula in Botswana, 8 km (5 mi) east of the town of Kasane.

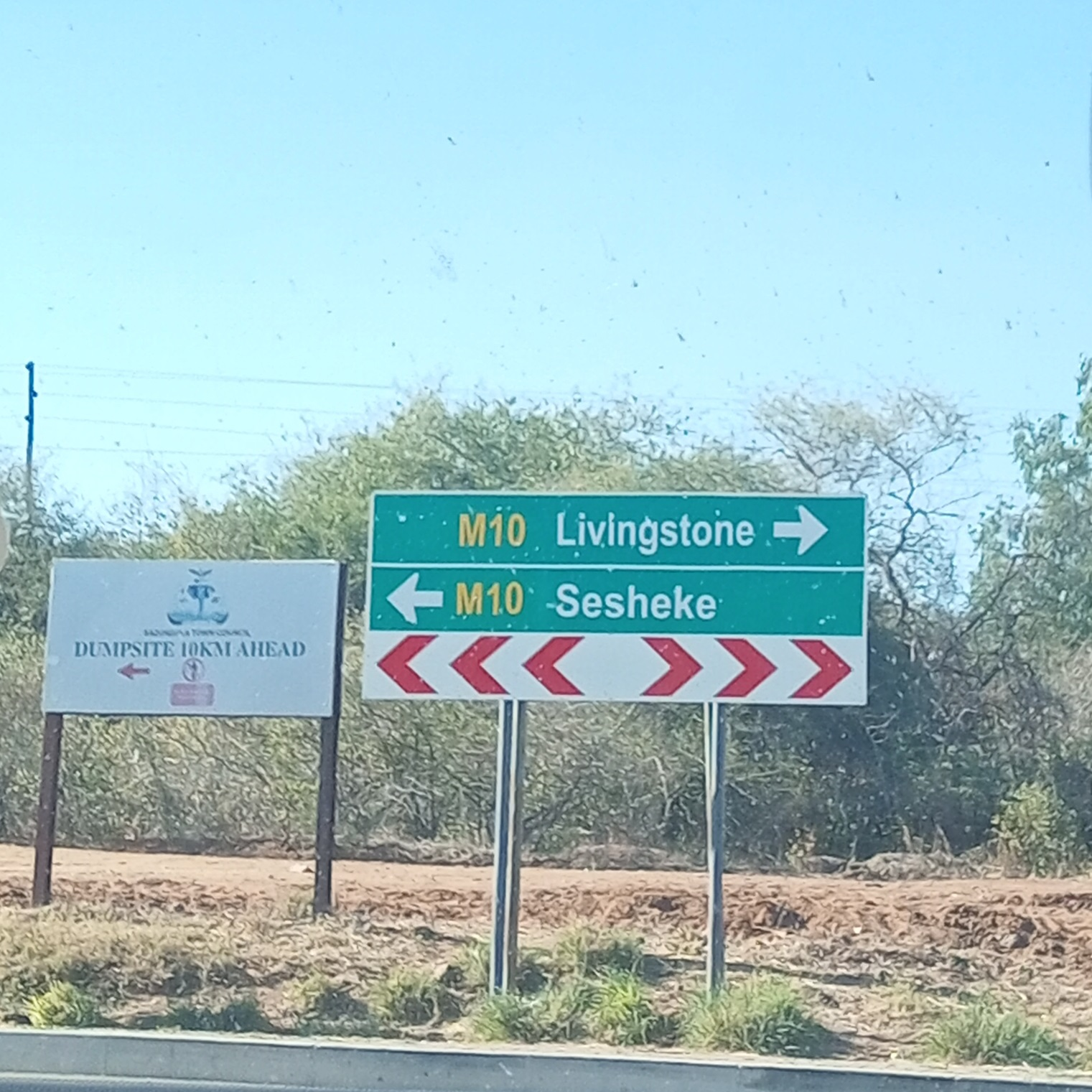
A road sign at the junction of the M10 and M19 in Kazungula.

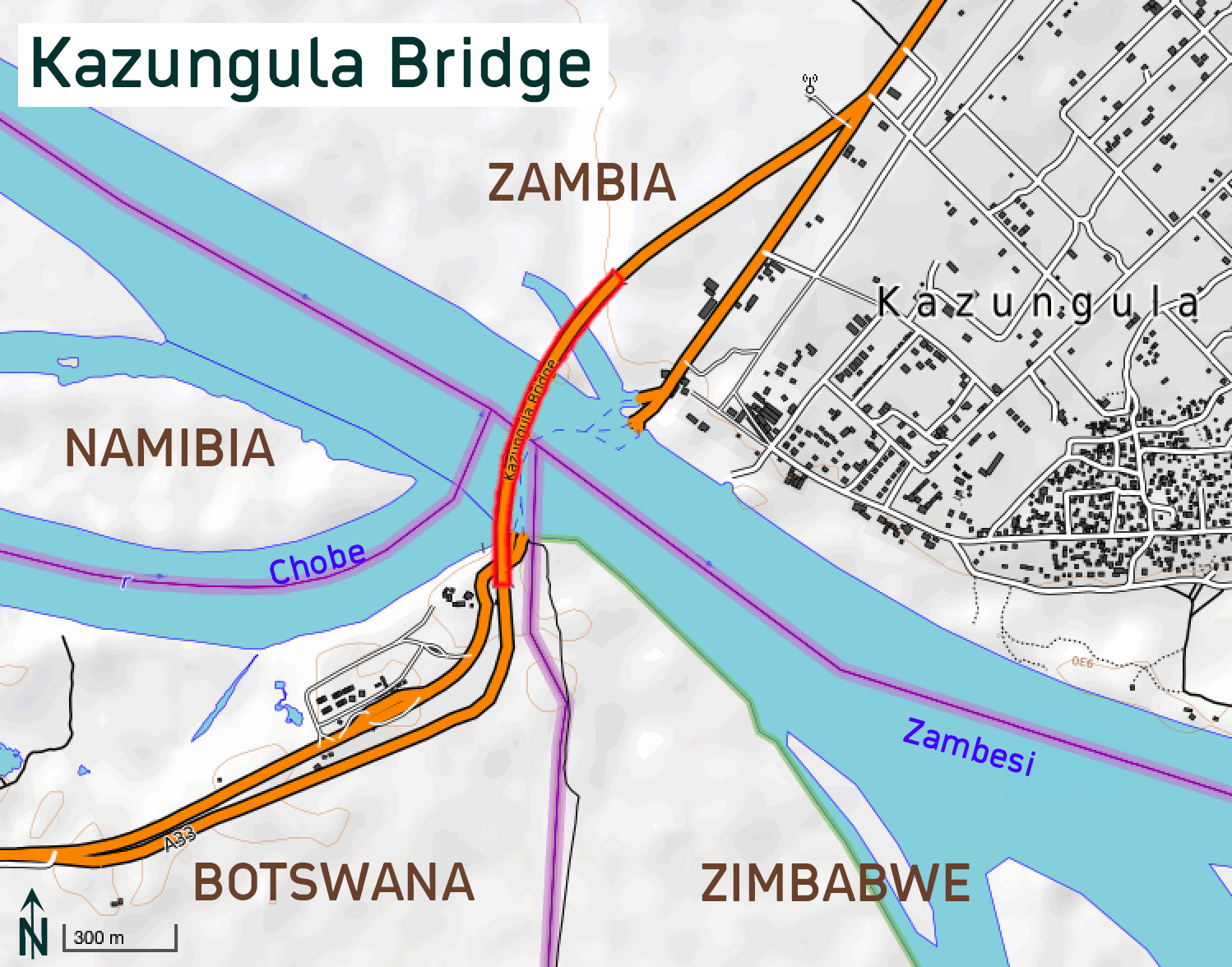
Map of the Kazungula Bridge in relation to the Kazungula border post, Botswana (southwest) and Kazungula town, Zambia (northeast)

The 923-by-18.5-metre-wide (3,028-by-61-foot) bridge has a longest span of 129 metres (423 ft) and is curved to avoid the nearby border of Zimbabwe. The bridge has a single-line railway track between two traffic lanes and pavements for pedestrians.

During the building of the Kazungula Bridge, Zimbabwe disputed that there was a direct border between Botswana and Zambia. Zimbabwe claimed that Botswana and Zambia do not have a direct border, but rather the border was actually between Zimbabwe and Namibia. What Botswana was claiming to be its land crossing the Zambezi was actually Zimbabwe's land and that this might lead to war. In April 2014, Zimbabwe's then Transport Minister Obert Mpofu was asked in Parliament about the Kazungula Bridge being built by Botswana and Zambia. He responded: "So, the position of government is that there is no direct border between Botswana and Zambia. If a bridge has to be constructed in that area, it will have to go through Zimbabwe, hence the stalemate."

According to NewZimbabwe.com, Botswana and Zambia, "upon realizing their mistake", then went back to the drawing board. They asked for Namibia's permission to use its territory, and Namibia agreed. The Kazungula bridge was then re-designed to curve to avoid Zimbabwean land. This was confirmed by Botswana's then Minister of Transport and Communications, Nonofo Molefi, in September 2014: "we approached Namibia and asked that the bridge pass through their territory and they agreed."

However the completed bridge does not go through Namibian territory according to Google Maps and the Sovereign Limits database. Discussion in the Zambian National Assembly in 2009 revealed that the Namibian government had "good will" towards the project and would allow it to "use and work in their territorial waters if need be".

=== Other road connections ===
Kazungula lies just 2 km (1.2 mi) from the Livingstone-Sesheke road (M10 road) which connects westwards to the Katima Mulilo Bridge linking Zambia and Namibia.

The border post between Zimbabwe and Botswana, 4.5 km (2.8 mi) (by road) south-east of Kazungula Bridge, is also called Kazungula; it is the most direct route leading to Victoria Falls.

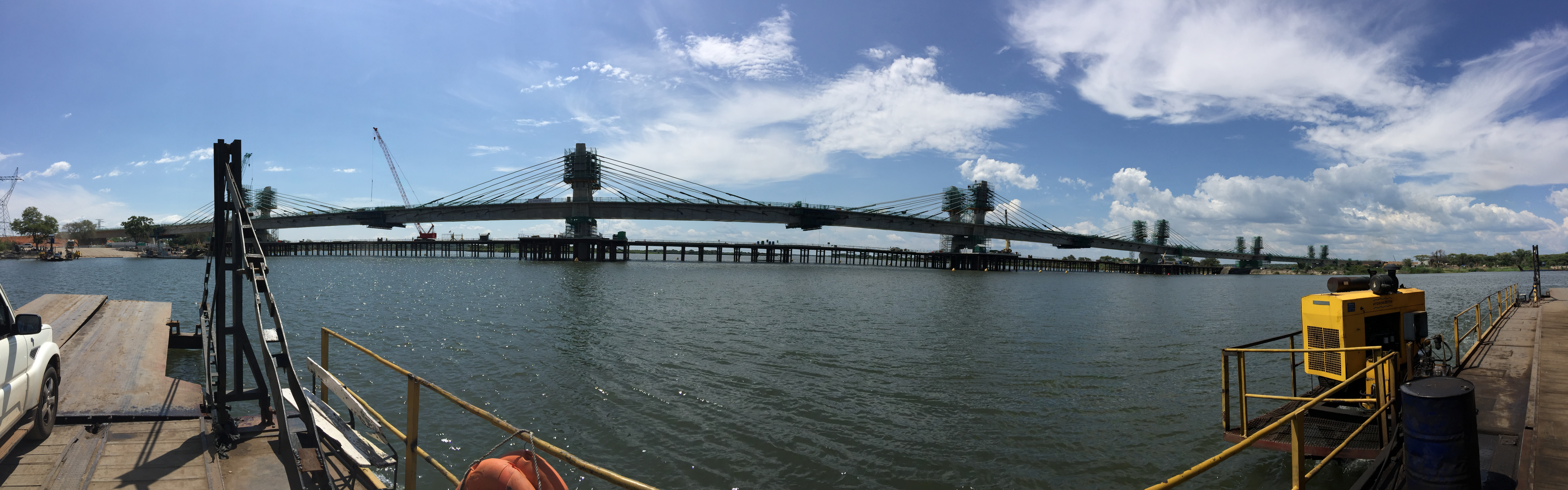
Panorama of the Kazungula bridge from a ferry

== General administration ==
Map showing the Botswana-Namibia-Zambia-Zimbabwe near-quadripoint (circled)

Kazungula was elevated to district status in September 1998. Government departments, parastatals, and NGOs operate there in agriculture, forestry and fisheries. The following governments and government departments operate: Council, education, health, police, National Registration, immigration, social welfare, community development and ZESCO.

== Political system, governance and traditional leadership ==
The district is covered by one parliamentary constituency and fourteen political wards which include Sikaunzwe, Sekute, Nwezi, Moomba, Nyawa, Nuba, Kauwe and Chooma. Traditionally, the district is divided into five chiefdoms and these are Chief Sekute, Chief Nyawa, Chief Musokotwane, Chief Mukuni and Chief Moomba. The main tribes in the district are Toka Leya, Nkoya, Lozi, and Tonga.

== Local economy ==
The majority (66%) of the population within Kazungula does not receive any form of income (CSO 2010). The largest industries are peasant/subsistence farming, cross-border trading and fishing. The main economic sectors in Kazungula are agriculture, manufacturing, trade, commerce and tourism.

The informal sector is characterised by fish trading, trading in second hand and new clothes and footwear, small-scale fishing, trading in vegetables and other foodstuffs, beer brewing, carpentry, production and selling of traditional handicrafts, trading in groceries, restaurants, bars and charcoal burning and selling. The major activity in the secondary sector is the generation of power at Batoka Gorge located in Mukuni ward. Other secondary sector activities though of less economic significance are the production of timber and carpentry.

== Infrastructure development ==
The following projects are at different stages of completion:

- Construction of the Kazungula District Hospital is at 90% under phase one of the project.
- Construction of 30 housing units for government departments is at various stages.
- Construction of Kazungula Bridge has completed.
- The construction of the truck yard superstructure is completed.
- Construction of 10 classroom blocks and 10 VIP toilets.
- Construction of CIVIC Centre is above ring beam while the District Administration is at slab level.
- The construction of the post office is at roof level.
- The local court is completed and operational.
- Construction of Sibandwa Dam.

== Agriculture ==
There are currently few commercial farmers in the district. Most of the farming communities in the district are in the category of small-scale farming. There are 10,522 small-scale farmers farming a wide range of crops such as maize, sorghum, millet, groundnuts and cotton. Some farmers have increased their fields to become medium-scale farmers. The crops grown by these farmers include but not limited to maize, sorghum, millet, groundnuts, cotton, cassava and vegetables. Livestock production in Kazungula District is done on a small scale by traditional pastorals. There are a number of livestock species that are reared in Kazungula District but the notable ones include cattle, goats, sheep, donkeys, poultry and pigs.

== Water and sanitation ==
In the area of sanitation, improvements under the urban and peri-urban water supply and sanitation are varied, covering the areas of solid waste management and maintenance of water supply schemes. Progress has been made in the area of construction and rehabilitation of boreholes with 30 new boreholes constructed and 32 boreholes rehabilitated in 2016. Kazungula has 380 existing water points which are functional, though water supply and sanitation service coverage are still very low. The majority of the urban population rely on on-site systems.

== Energy ==
There are no filling stations in the district. Wood fuel (firewood and charcoal) remains the dominant source of energy in the district, accounting for almost 80 per cent of total energy consumption. Firewood is predominantly consumed by rural households while charcoal is a major source of energy for urban households. The annual loss of forest cover was estimated at 1.2% due to land clearing for agricultural use rather than energy purposes.

== See also ==
- Kazungula Bridge
- Kazungula Ferry
