= Kazungula, Zimbabwe =

Port of entry in Zimbabwe

Coordinates: 17°48′52″S 25°15′54″E

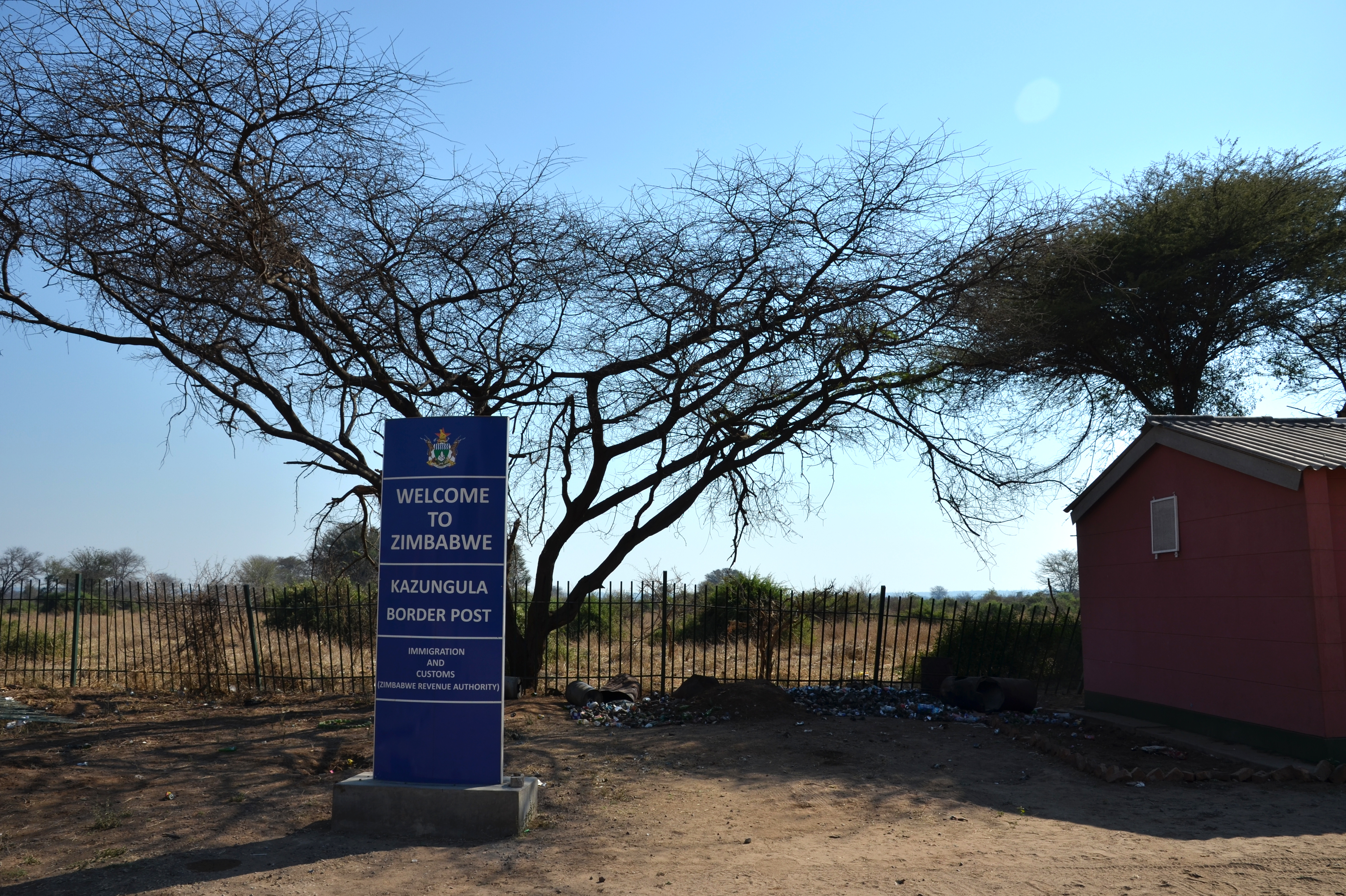
Kazungula border post sign

Kazungula is a Zimbabwean port of entry in Matabeleland North, close to the country's quadripoint with Botswana, Namibia, and Zambia. Just to the west is the Botswana border town of Kazungula, from where there is a bridge for vehicles to cross the Zambezi River to the town in Zambia that is also named Kazungula. Kazungula is linked by a tarred road to Victoria Falls, 70 km east. It is the third busiest port of entry in Zimbabwe, with the Zimbabwe National Statistics Agency reporting 44,750 visitors passing through in 2024.
