= Pontoon boat =

Boat that relies on multiple floats for buoyancy

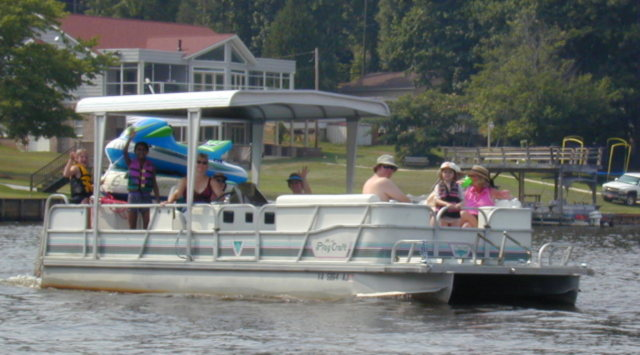
A pleasure boat with two lengthwise pontoons

A pontoon boat is a flattish boat that relies on floats to remain buoyant. These pontoons (also called tubes) contain much reserve buoyancy and allow designers to create large deck plans fitted with a variety of accommodations including expansive lounge areas, stand-up bars, and sun pads. More horsepower is now able to be applied to the stern due to design improvements. Pontoon boat drafts may be as shallow as eight inches (20 centimetres), which reduces risk of running aground and underwater damage; this allows it to come close to shore to pick up and drop off loads.

== History ==
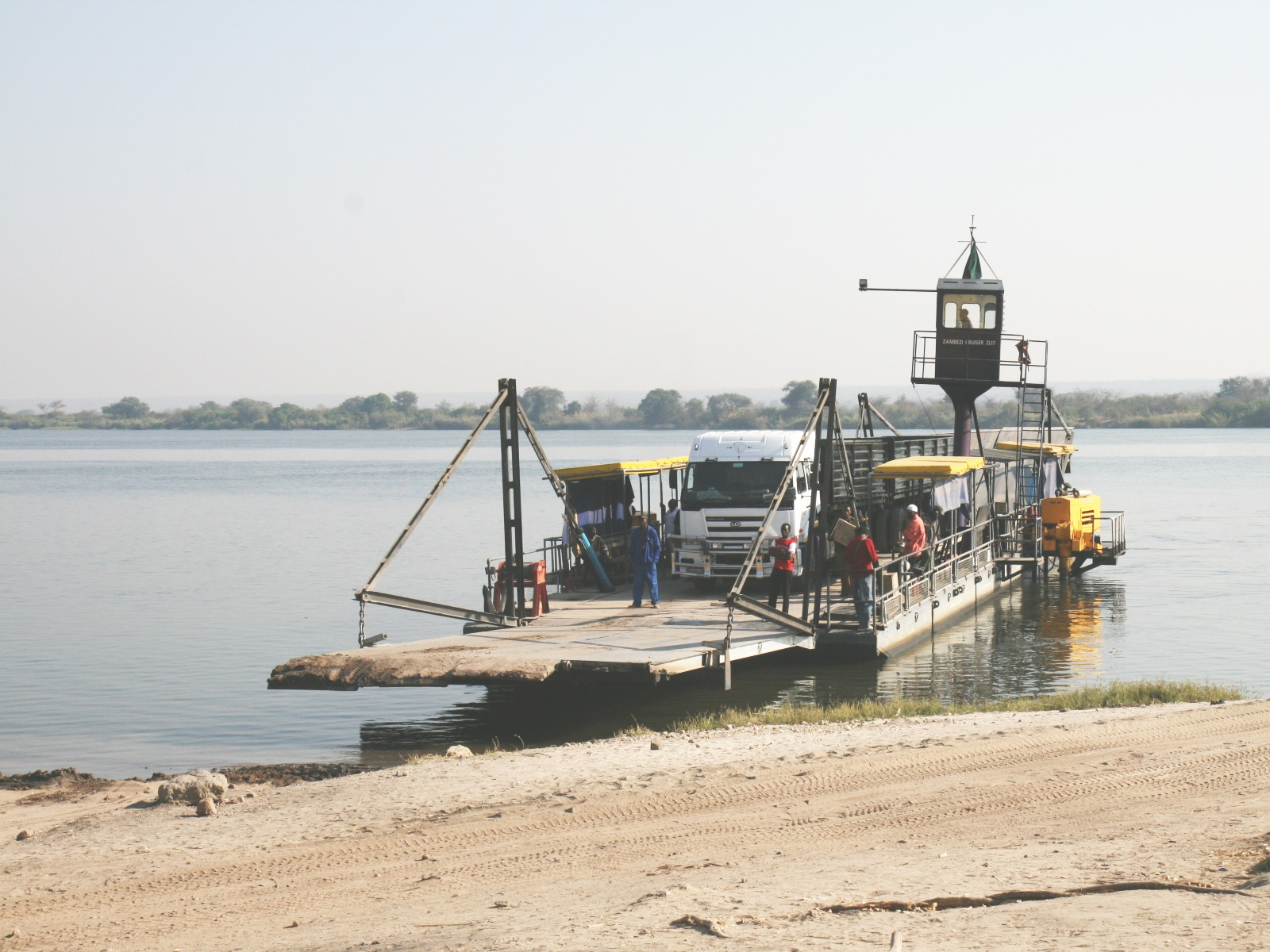
A pontoon ferry crossing the Zambezi at Kazungula

The 1952 invention of the pontoon motorboat in the United States is credited to a farmer who lived on the Horseshoe Chain of Lakes, near Richmond, Minnesota. Ambrose Weeres put a wooden platform on two columns of steel barrels welded together end-to-end, creating a sturdy deck that would be more stable on a lake than a conventional boat. Living in the "Land of 10,000 Lakes," Weeres thought this idea might be marketed. The first boat was "The Empress". He built a few boats and sold them with the help of dealers. He started Weeres Industries to meet unexpected demand. Weeres, later called "Mr. Pontoon", was elected to the Minnesota Marina Hall of Fame.

== Designs and uses ==
Common pontoon boat designs are a catamaran with two hulls, or a trimaran with three hulls. Boats with three hulls are sometimes called tri-toons.

Pontoon boat designs have changed significantly since the early 2000s, with boats now featuring larger tubes, increased engine horsepower, and cuddy cabins.

Pontoon boats are used for pleasure on lakes and rivers, and in some cases on oceans close to shore. Pontoon watersport activities include tubing, waterskiing, and wakeboarding. Common pontoon accessories include inflatable slides, diving boards, sun shades, and Bimini tops.

They are also used as small vessel ferries to cross rivers and lakes in many parts of the world, especially in Africa. Pontoon ferries may be motorized, such as the Kazungula Ferry across the Zambezi River, or powered by another boat, or pulled by cables. A type of ferry known as the cable ferry (also called punts in medieval times and in modern Australia and New Zealand) pull themselves across a river using a motor or human power applied to the cable, which also guides the pontoon. Pontoons may support a platform, creating a raft. A raft supporting a house-like structure is a houseboat. A pontoon boat keeping a sauna cabin is called a sauna boat or sauntoon.

Small inflatable pontoon boats are one or two-person, catamaran-type boats, designed for leisure and fishing. Their pontoons are made out of abrasion-resistant PVC and nylon with aluminum, steel, and plastic frames for support. In today's setting, more and more people prefer to use frameless pontoon boats. They are powered with paddles, oars and often with electric trolling motors using deep cycle lead batteries. Commonly they are equipped with motor mount, battery storage area, fishing rod holders, canopy, fishfinder mount, small anchor, and other required fishing gear. Such boats are suitable for ponds, lakes, rivers, and seas during calm weather. However, due to their light weight, they are susceptible to waves and windy conditions. Nonetheless, such boats are often used even for big game fishing.

Jumbo pontoon boats are used to give guided tours to tourists.

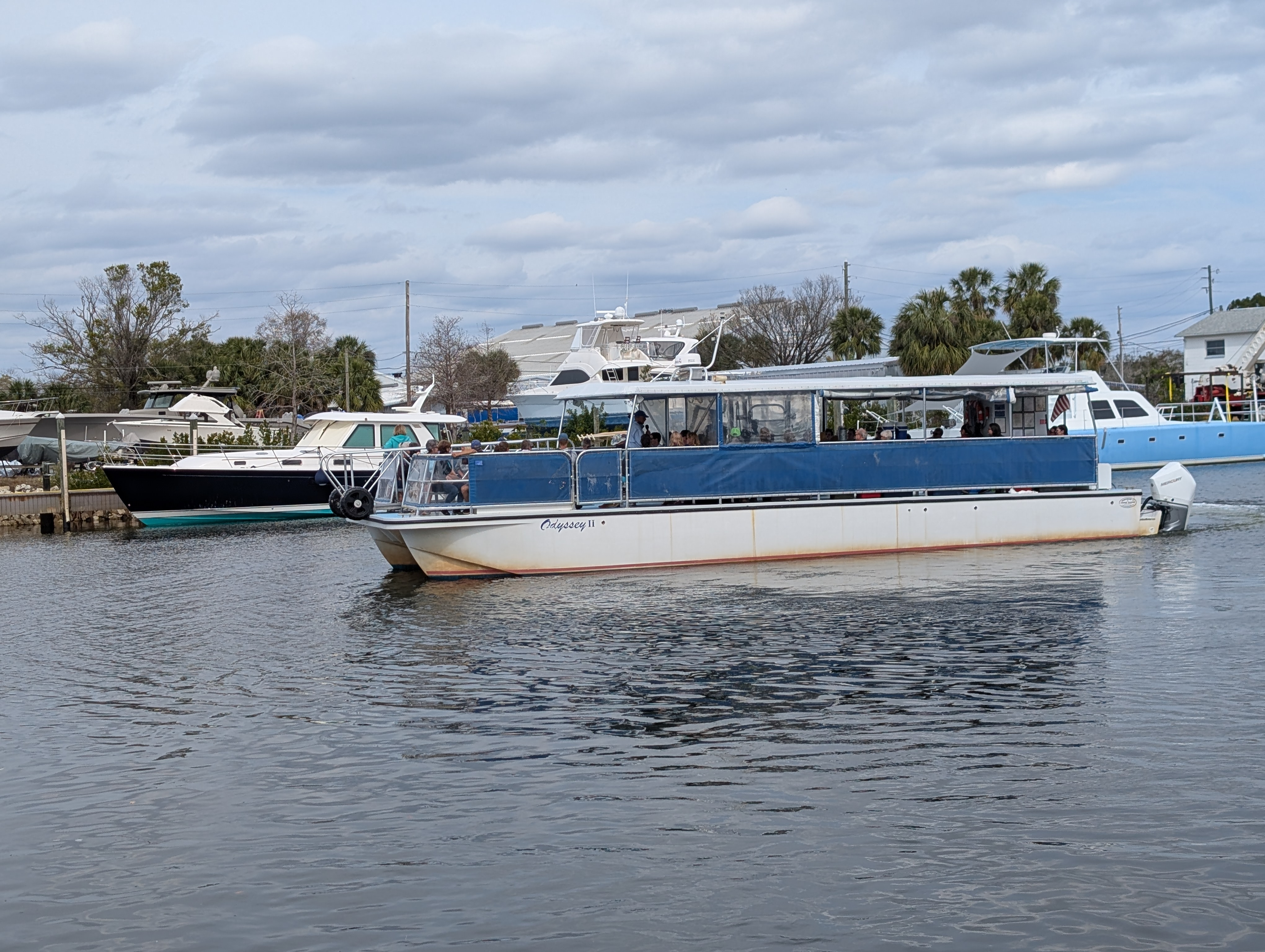
Odyssey Cruises jumbo pontoon boat

Hydrodynamic design and analysis of lift and drag characteristics of round pontoon planing surfaces is complex, since the deadrise angle is changing with pontoon arc (circumference), but this is resolved with this paper.

== Safety ==
The pontoon effect is when a large force applied to the side capsizes a pontoon boat without much warning, particularly a top-heavy boat.

== See also ==
- Catamaran – Watercraft with two parallel hulls of equal size
- Pontoon bridge – Type of floating bridge
- Barge – Watercraft
- Raft – Flat structure for support or transportation over water
- Buoy – Floating structure or device
- Rhino ferry – Barge made from several pontoons
- Rigid buoyant boat – Type of boat
- Airboat – Type of watercraft propelled by an aircraft propeller
