= Kasane =

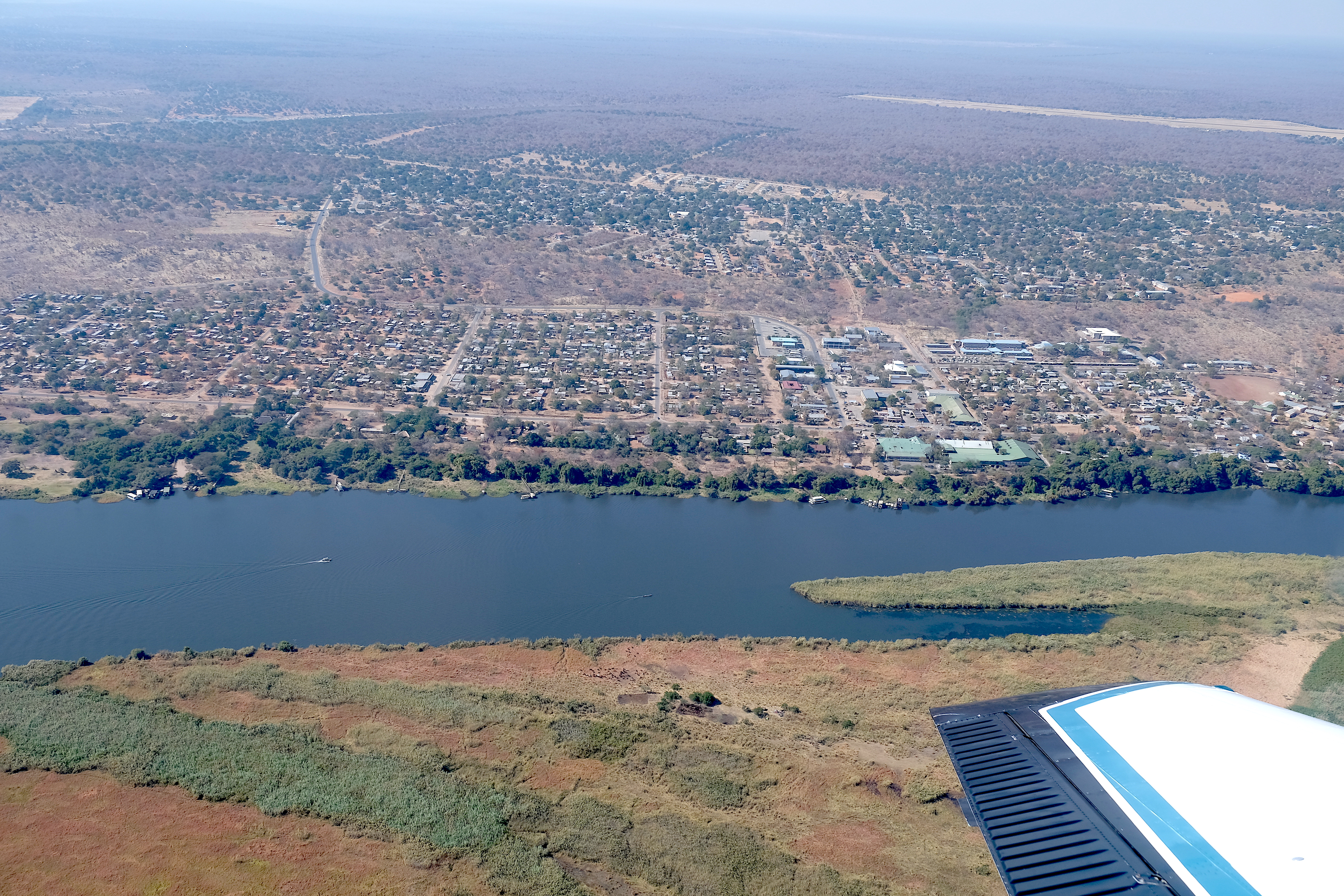
- Aerial view of Kasane with Chobe River; Top right corner Kasane Airport

- Location within Botswana
- Coordinates: 17°49′S 025°09′E
- Country: Botswana
- District: Chobe District

Population (Census 2001)
  - Total: 9,008
- Climate: BSh

Kasane is a town in Botswana, close to Africa's 'Four Corners', where the borders of Botswana, Namibia, Zambia and Zimbabwe almost meet. The town is at the far northeastern corner of Botswana where it serves as the administrative center of the Chobe District. The population of Kasane was 9,244 at the 2011 census.

Kasane briefly obtained international fame as the location of the remarriage of Elizabeth Taylor to Richard Burton, in 1975.

== Transport ==
Kasane Airport

The town lies on the south bank of the 200–300 metres (660–980 ft) wide Chobe River which forms the border with the extreme tip of Namibia's Caprivi Strip. The Namibian island of Impalila lies opposite the town on the north bank of the river, and there is a border crossing by passenger ferry to Namibia. About 8 kilometres (5 mi) to the east of Kasane is the village of Kazungula, where Botswana has 1.6 kilometres (1.0 mi) of frontage to the Zambezi river immediately below its confluence with the Chobe River. Here the Kazungula border post serves the Kazungula Bridge crossing to Kazungula in Zambia on the north bank of the Zambezi. Nearby a second border post serves the road into Zimbabwe which runs 70 kilometres (43 mi) east to Victoria Falls.

Kasane is at the northern end of the tarred highway from Francistown and Gaborone which is a regional artery between southern and central Africa particularly for trucks too heavy for the Victoria Falls Bridge's periodic weight restrictions. There is also a tarred road to the Namibian border 51 km west at Ngoma.

Kasane is at the north-eastern boundary of Chobe National Park and its road links make it a popular access point for tourists to the park as well as those including it in an itinerary taking in the Okavango Delta, the Caprivi Strip and Victoria Falls.

The town is served by Kasane Airport.

== Amenities and social places ==
Kasane has a number of campsites and lodges (accommodations oriented towards the safari business), including the Chobe Safari Lodge, where Elizabeth Taylor and Richard Burton spent their honeymoon. These lodges offer day trips into the Chobe National Park and Victoria Falls. The town also has a few docks on the Chobe River for boat trips and river safaris, as well as ferries across to the Kasika border crossing in Namibia.

Kasane has ABSA Bank, First National Bank, Stanbic and Standard Chartered Bank with ATM facility. There is a Spar grocery store in the town center.

== Climate ==
Climate data for Kasane (1991–2020)
Month	Jan	Feb	Mar	Apr	May	Jun	Jul	Aug	Sep	Oct	Nov	Dec	Year
Record high °C (°F)	38.6 (101.5)	39.9 (103.8)	38.1 (100.6)	35.8 (96.4)	33.8 (92.8)	36.7 (98.1)	32.8 (91.0)	36.5 (97.7)	40.3 (104.5)	41.0 (105.8)	40.7 (105.3)	39.5 (103.1)	41.0 (105.8)
Mean daily maximum °C (°F)	30.9 (87.6)	30.6 (87.1)	30.4 (86.7)	30.4 (86.7)	28.6 (83.5)	26.4 (79.5)	26.3 (79.3)	29.7 (85.5)	33.7 (92.7)	35.8 (96.4)	33.9 (93.0)	31.5 (88.7)	30.7 (87.3)
Daily mean °C (°F)	25.3 (77.5)	25.0 (77.0)	24.7 (76.5)	23.0 (73.4)	20.1 (68.2)	17.8 (64.0)	17.5 (63.5)	20.8 (69.4)	24.7 (76.5)	27.7 (81.9)	27.1 (80.8)	25.8 (78.4)	23.2 (73.8)
Mean daily minimum °C (°F)	19.5 (67.1)	19.2 (66.6)	18.5 (65.3)	15.6 (60.1)	11.5 (52.7)	9.1 (48.4)	8.5 (47.3)	11.5 (52.7)	15.6 (60.1)	19.2 (66.6)	20.1 (68.2)	19.8 (67.6)	15.6 (60.1)
Record low °C (°F)	12.4 (54.3)	14.0 (57.2)	8.6 (47.5)	4.4 (39.9)	4.0 (39.2)	0.5 (32.9)	1.5 (34.7)	1.2 (34.2)	4.1 (39.4)	10.0 (50.0)	12.0 (53.6)	11.8 (53.2)	0.5 (32.9)
Average precipitation mm (inches)	192.5 (7.58)	139.4 (5.49)	118.3 (4.66)	51.5 (2.03)	8.1 (0.32)	8.3 (0.33)	0.5 (0.02)	4.5 (0.18)	5.9 (0.23)	24.3 (0.96)	108.4 (4.27)	151.5 (5.96)	1,044.2 (41.11)
Average rainy days (≥ 10 mm)	4	4	2	1	0	0	0	0	0	1	2	4	18
Source 1: Météo Climat
Source 2: World Meteorological Organization (rain days 1971–2000)

== Gallery ==
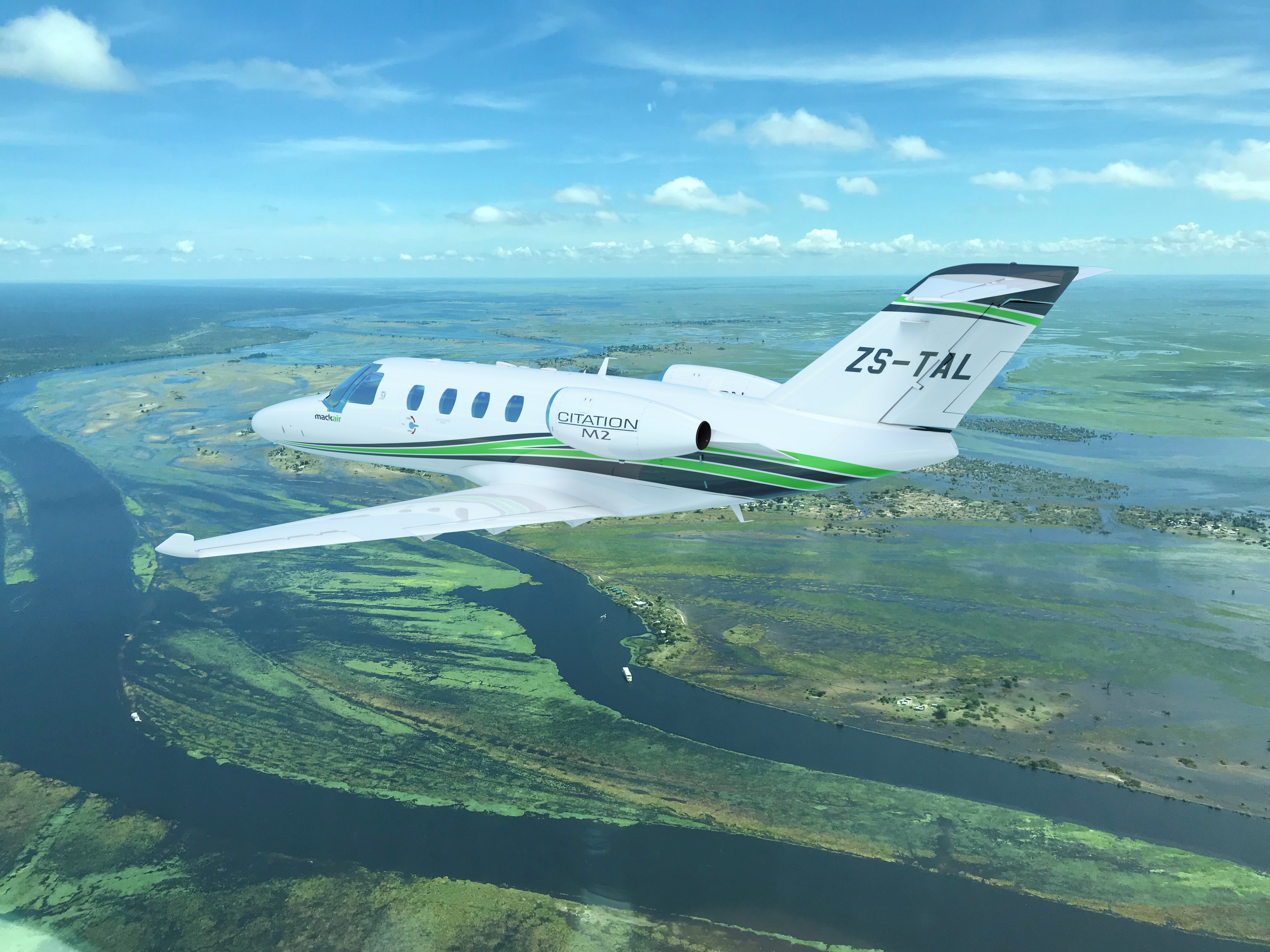
Air Cessna Citation M2 over Kasane, Botswana

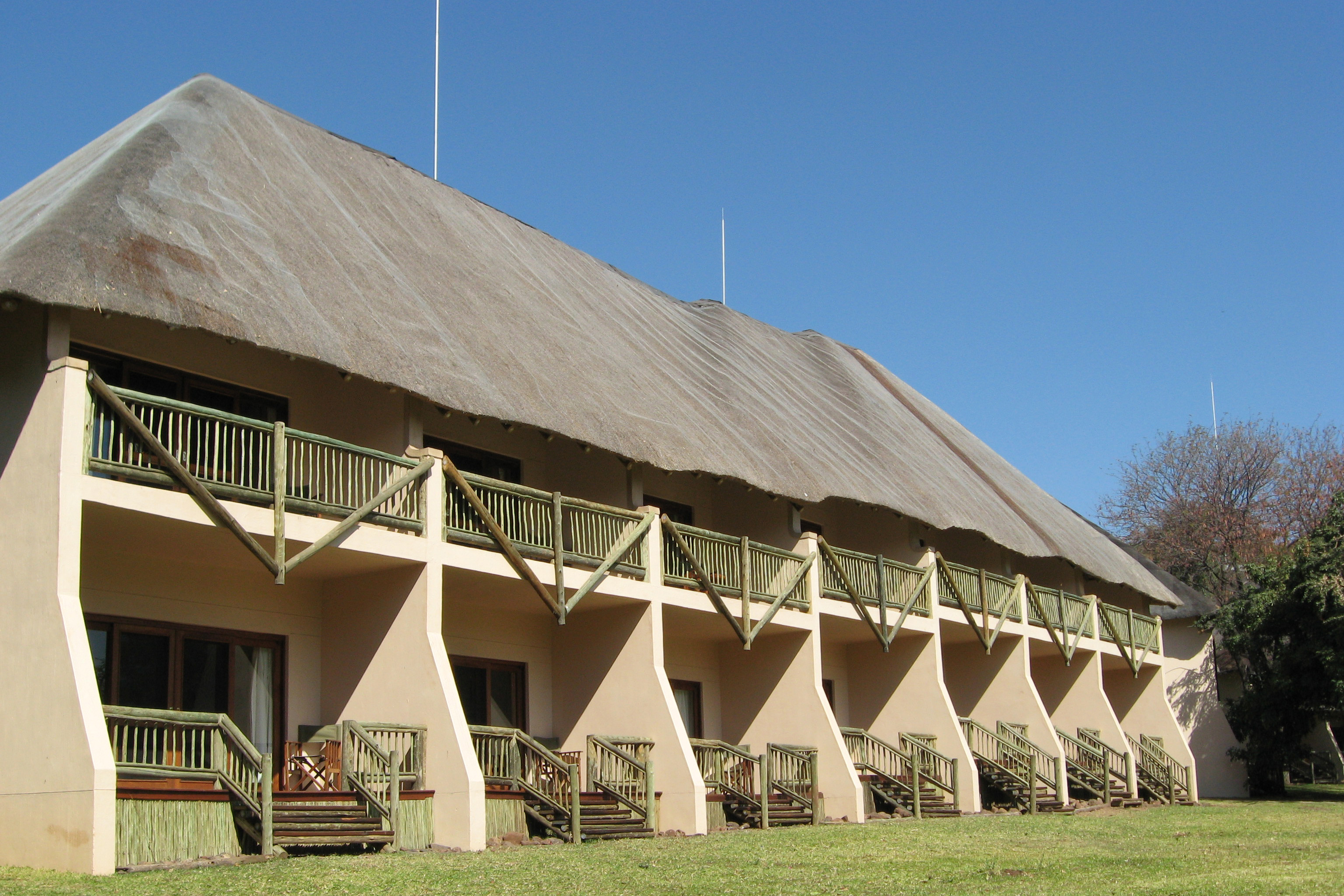
Kasane Chobe Safari Lodge

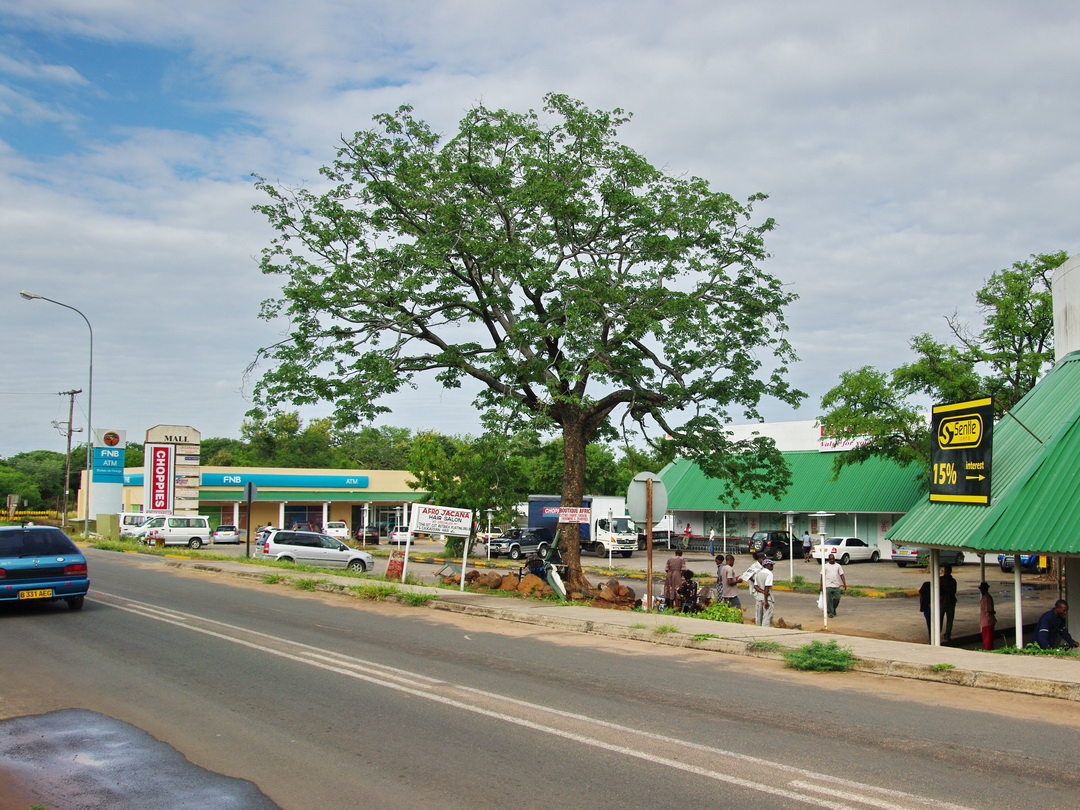
Downtown Kasane

Kasane Airport

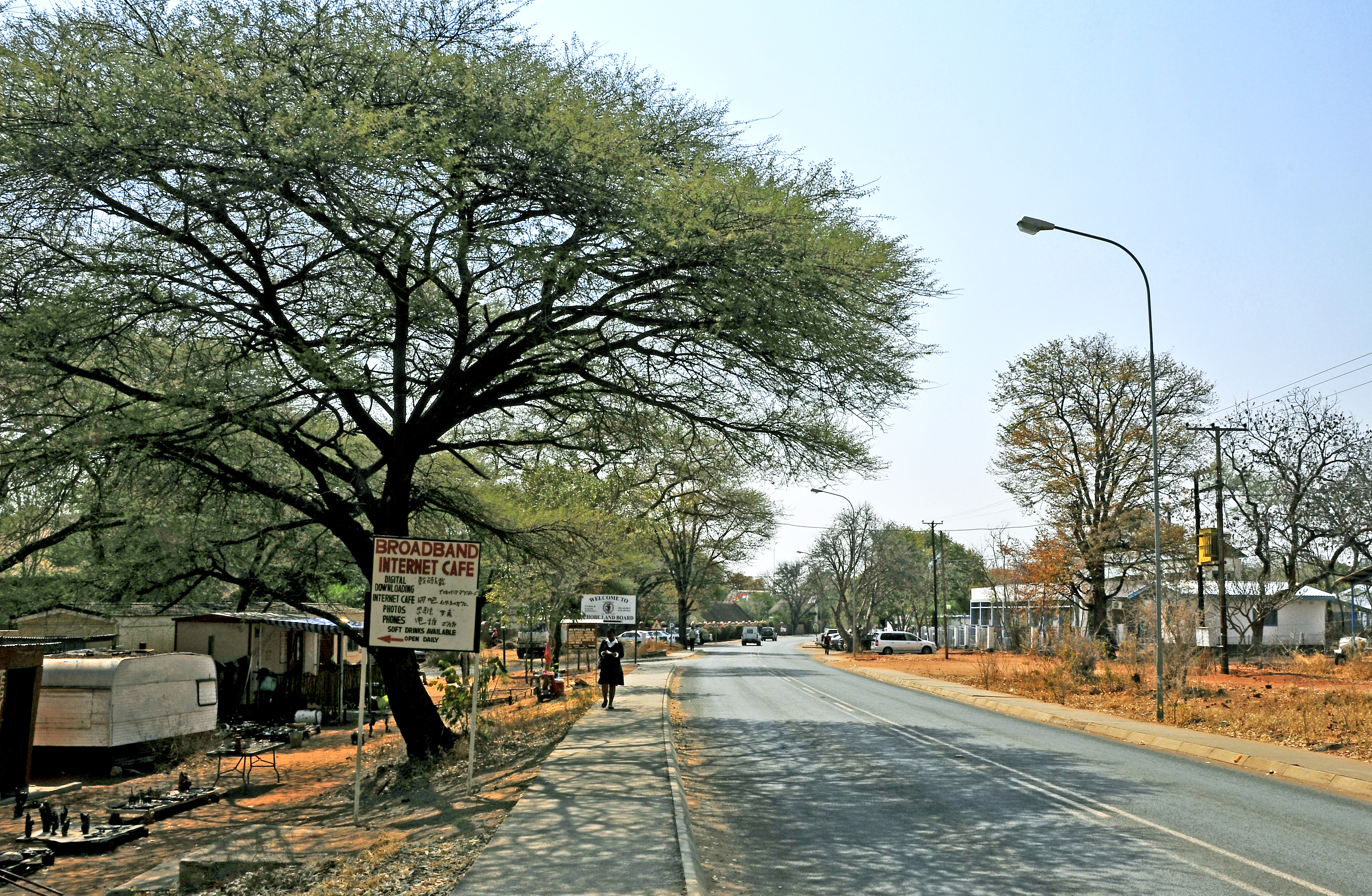
Kasane street

Kasane Airport

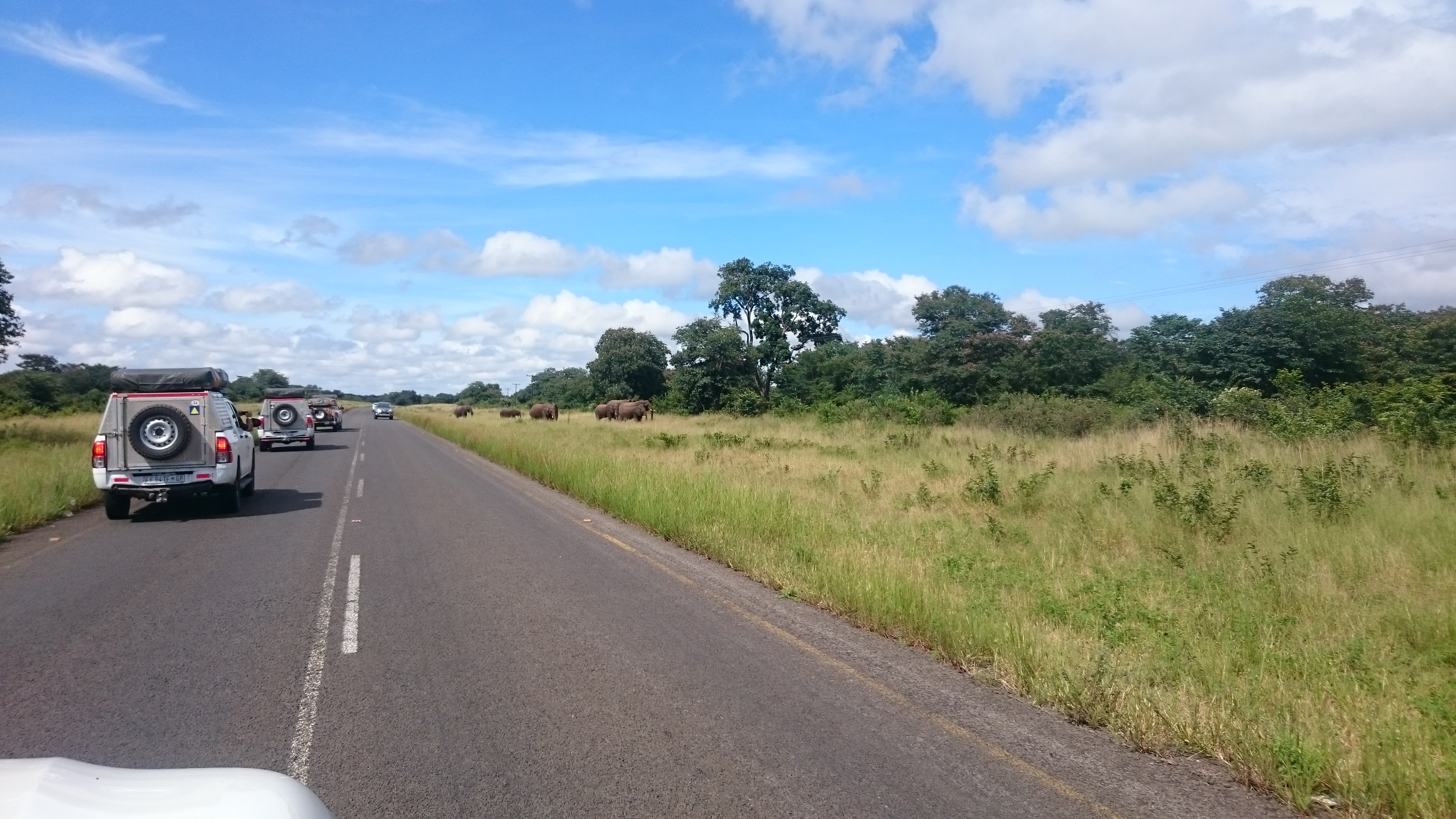
Kasane road

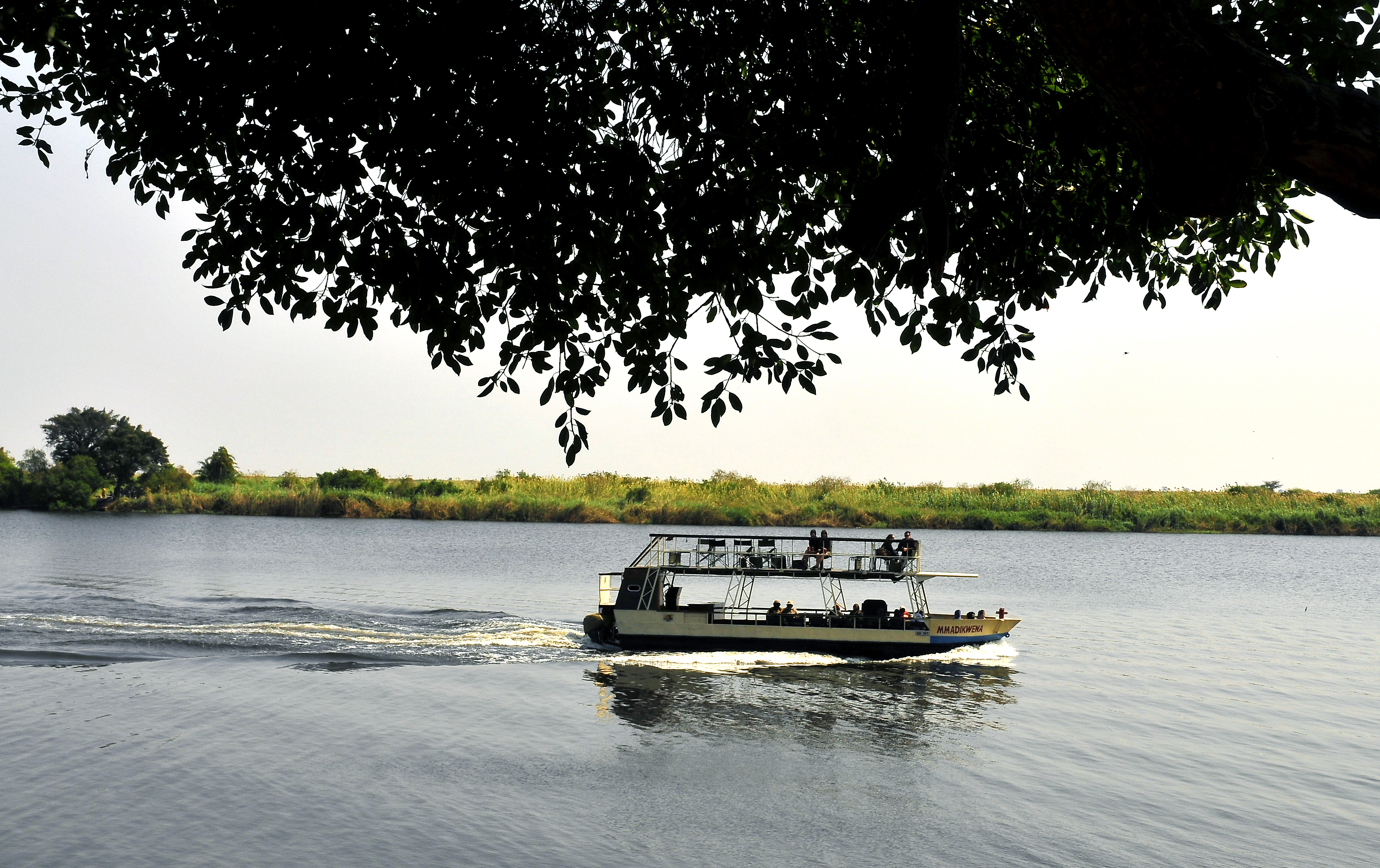
Kasane: Chobe River boat cruise

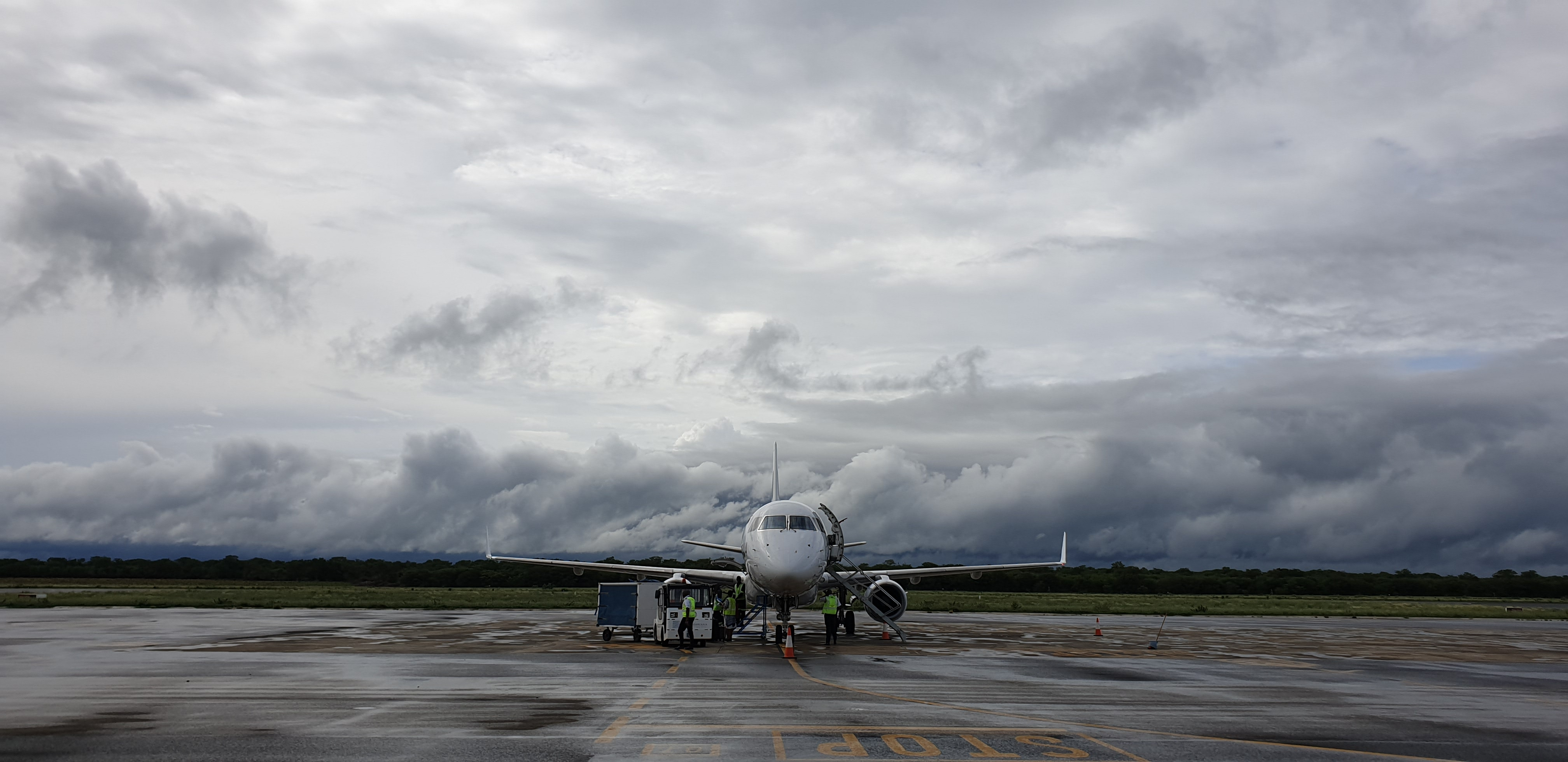
Air Botswana new Embraer E170 at Kasane International Airport
