= Katima Mulilo Bridge =

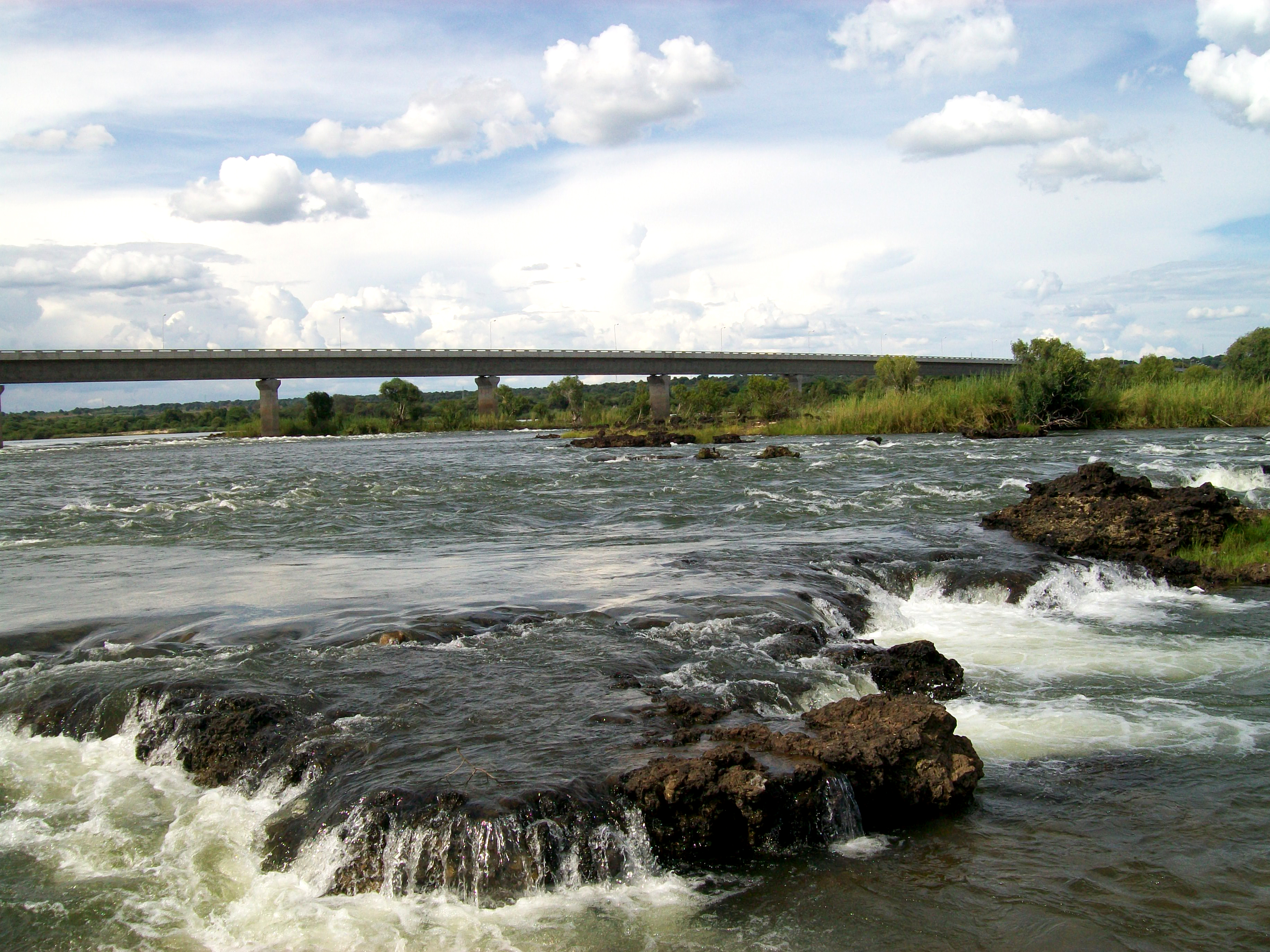
- Coordinates: 17°28′18″S 24°14′59.73″E
- Crosses: Zambezi River
- Locale: Sesheke, Zambia

Characteristics
- Total length: 900 metres (3,000 ft)
- No. of spans: 19

History
- Constructed by: Concor; Hochtief
- Inaugurated: 13 May 2004

Location
- Interactive map of Katima Mulilo Bridge

The Katima Mulilo Bridge (also known as Bridge 508 in the Namibian Bridge Register) carries the TransCaprivi Highway over the Zambezi River between Katima Mulilo, Namibia and Sesheke, Zambia. It is a road bridge, completed in 2004, 900 metres long and with 19 spans. It links Namibia's Trans–Caprivi Highway to the Zambian road network, forming a section of the trade route from south-central Africa to the Atlantic known as the Walvis Bay-Ndola-Lubumbashi Development Road. It also carries tourist traffic.

== Requirement for the bridge ==
Pedestrians and passenger vehicles used to cross the river nearby by ferry. Plans for the bridge, the only one over the Zambezi for hundreds of kilometers, were first considered in Namibia in 1982, and the number 508 was allocated to the project. However, the occupying South Africa government was opposed to the project and considered it an act of high treason to build a bridge to independent, racially not segregated, Zambia.

The initiator of the planning, Klaus Dierks, was subsequently dismissed as Chief Bridge Engineer of the territory.

Only after Namibian independence was planning resumed in 1990. The bridge was built entirely on Zambian soil because Zambia was a least developed country at the time and thus qualified for a grant to build it, while Namibia did not have this status and would have had to repay a loan. Today, this bridge is part of Zambia's M10 Road (Livingstone-Mongu Road).

It is a major point on the Walvis Bay-Ndola-Lubumbashi Development Road.

== Construction ==
As the bridge was built on Zambian soil, it is entirely part of Zambia and is part of Zambia's M10 Route. When coming from the town of Sesheke, the entire bridge is crossed before the border post with Namibia is reached.

In 2002 the contract for construction was awarded to Concor of South Africa and Hochtief of Germany, with the bridge completed on schedule in 2004. The bridge was constructed using the German technique of incremental launching (Taktschiebe-Verfahren), with the deck of the bridge constructed on location and then hydraulically pushed segment-by-segment across the river.

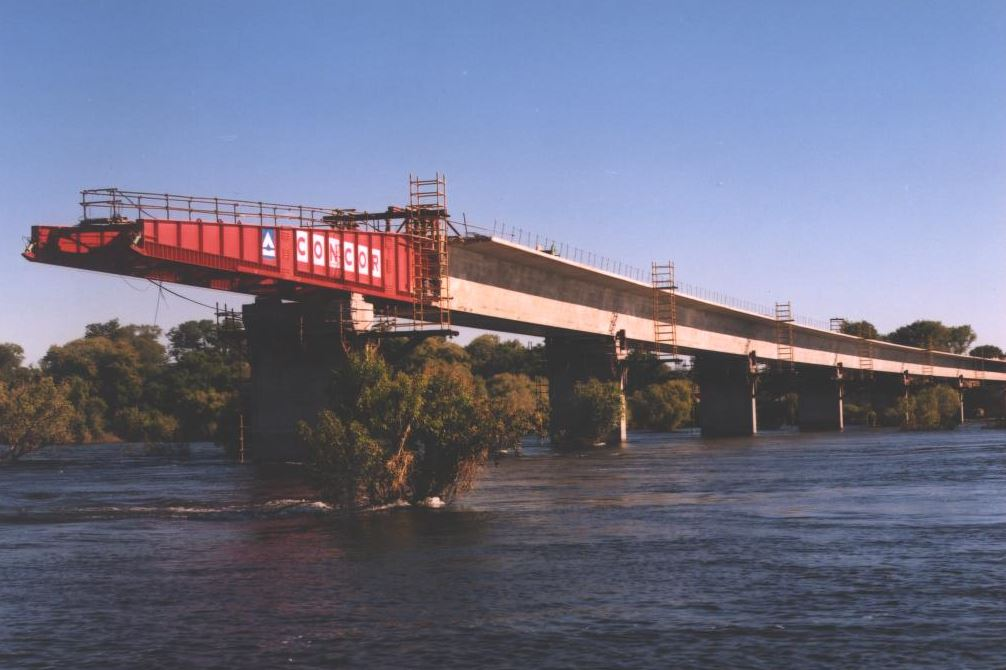
Katima Mulilo Incremental Bridge launch, 2003

== Opening ==
The bridge was officially opened by the President of Namibia, Dr. Sam Nujoma, and President of Zambia, Levy Mwanawasa on 13 May 2004, in Katima Mulilo.

== See also ==
- List of crossings of the Zambezi River
- List of international bridges
