= Kazungula, Botswana =

Border town in Chobe District, Botswana

Kazungula
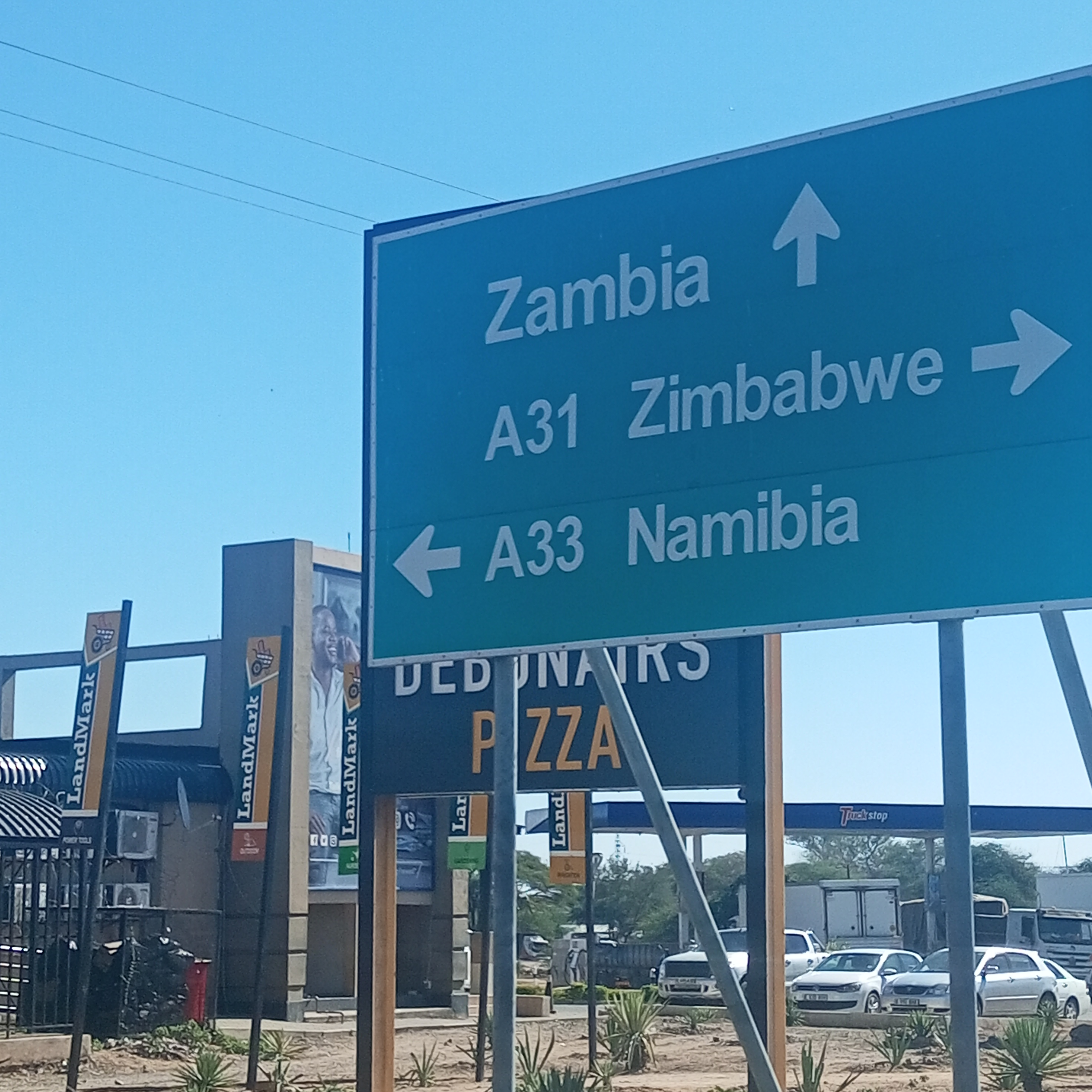
- A road sign on the A33 in Kazungula

- Location of Kazungula in Botswana
- Coordinates: 17°48′14″S 025°14′28″E
- Country: Botswana
- District: Chobe District

Population (2011)
  - Total: 4,133
- Climate: BSh

Kazungula is a border town in Chobe District, northern Botswana, about 8 kilometres east of the district capital Kasane. It lies on the south bank of the Chobe and Zambezi rivers, close to the quadripoint where the borders of Botswana, Zambia, Namibia and Zimbabwe converge. It was the capital of Chobe District from 1909 to 1921. As of the 2011 census, it had a population of 4,133.

Kazungula has historically been an important crossing point on the Zambezi river for different peoples and their goods. During the wars of national liberation of the 20th century, many anti-colonial fighters escaped to Zambia via Kazungula.

== Etymology ==
The name Kazungula is derived from the sausage tree (Kigelia africana), known locally as mzungula.

== Geography ==
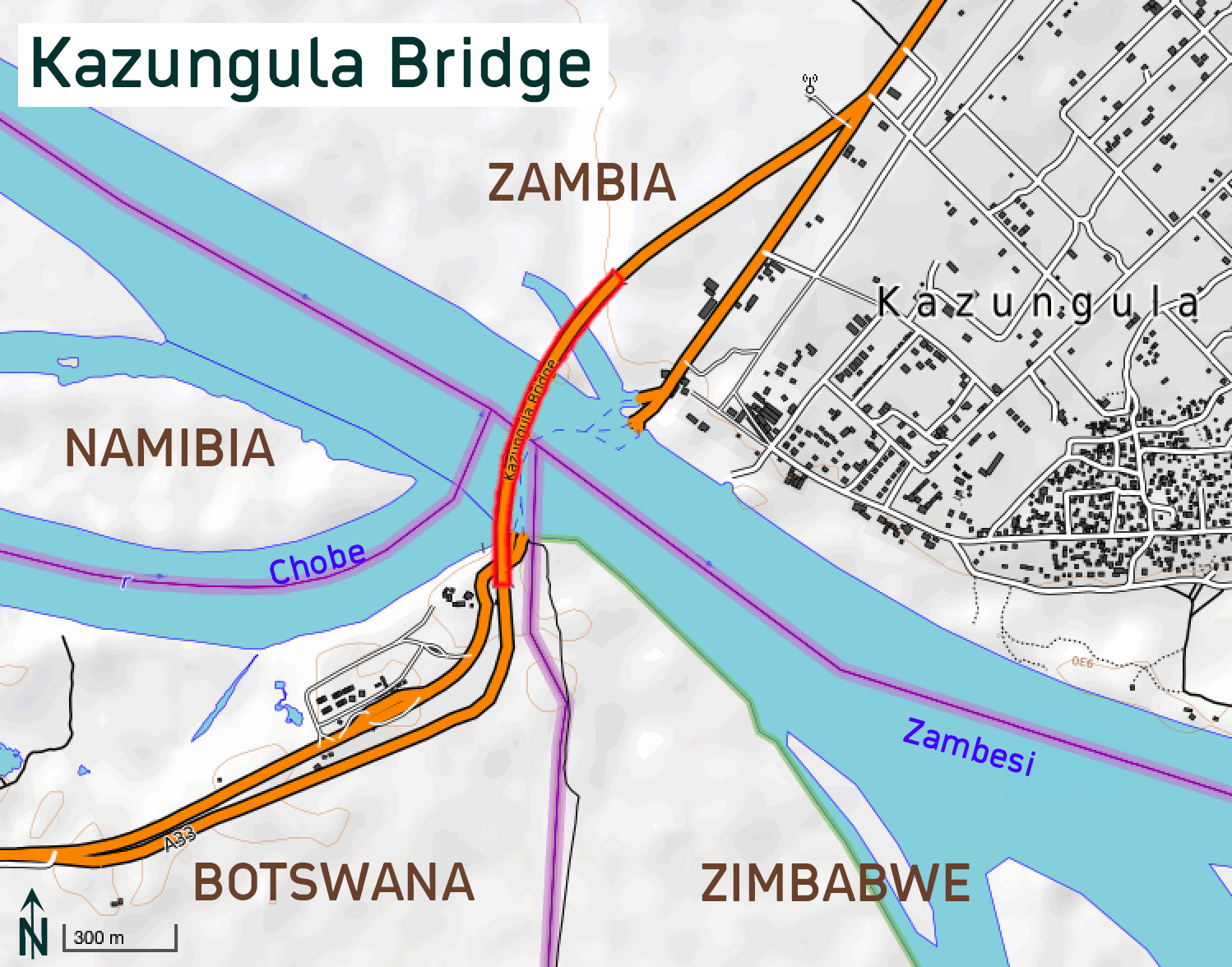
Map of the Kazungula Bridge in relation to the Kazungula, Botswana (southwest), and Kazungula, Zambia (northeast)

Kazungula is located near the quadripoint where the borders of Botswana, Zambia, Namibia and Zimbabwe meet. The Kazungula Bridge (opened in May 2021) crosses the Zambezi and connects Kazungula to a border town in Zambia, also named Kazungula. It was built to replace the Kazungula Ferry. Travellers may also drive east to another border town named Kazungula in Zimbabwe, via the Kazungula Road crossing.

== History ==
At confluence of the Chobe and Zambezi rivers, Kazungula has been a crossing point of the latter for centuries, connecting Central Africa and Southern Africa. Kazungula was where David Livingstone and other mid-19th century European explorers first saw the Zambezi before crossing it to present-day Zambia. Locals historically crossed the Zambezi on traditional canoes named mekoro, crafted from sausage trees. Modern commercial boats were not used in Kazungula until 1884, when pieces of a pontoon boat were imported from Austria and assembled locally. The importance of Kazungula as a centre of transport diminished following the 1905 opening of the road and rail bridge at Victoria Falls. However, it remained an important hub for the movement of goods and migrant labourers.

Kazungula was the administrative centre of Chobe District from 1909 to 1921. The colonial authority of the local resident magistrate was expanded to Eastern Caprivi in November 1914, following its capture from German West Africa during World War I. Kazungula ceased being the administrative centre of Chobe District when the resident magistrate's residence was moved to nearby Kasane in 1921.

From 1935 to 1969, Kazungula was a recruitment post for the Witwatersrand Native Labour Association (WENELA), which recruited workers for South African gold mines.

Starting in the 1960s, Kazungula became a frequent escape route for anti-colonial fighters fleeing to Zambia from Mozambique, Namibia, South Africa, and Zimbabwe.

In 2021, the Kazungula Bridge was opened to replace the Kazungula Ferry as the primary means of crossing the Zambezi.

== Demographics ==
The 2011 census recorded a population of 4,133 residents and a labour force of 2,013 workers, with 3 languages spoken among the populace.
