= Kazungula District =

Coordinates: 17°00′S 25°37′E

- District
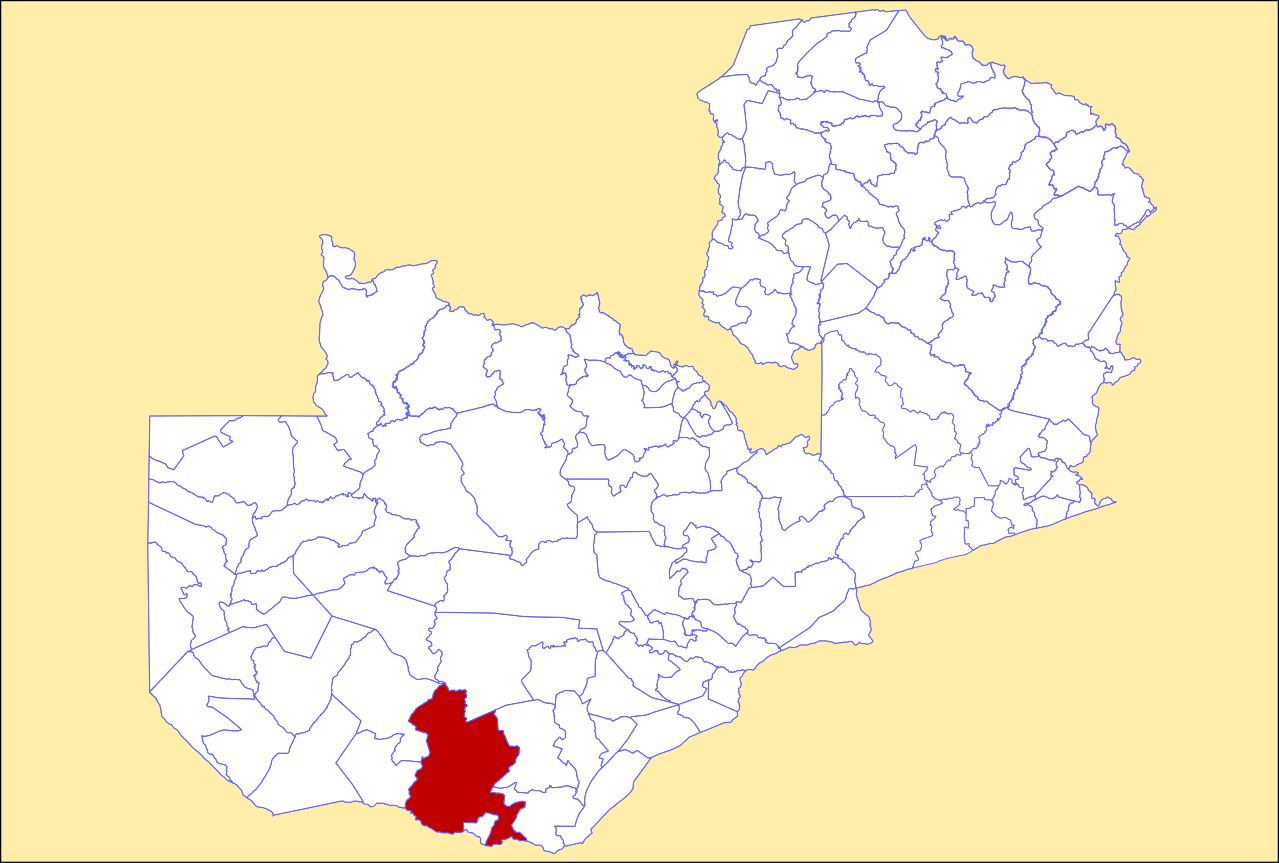
- District location in Zambia
- Country: Zambia
- Province: Southern Province
- Capital: Kazungula

Area
  - Total: 18,055.6 km^{2} (6,971.3 sq mi)

Population (2022)
  - Total: 173,002
  - Density: 9.58163/km^{2} (24.8163/sq mi)
- Time zone: UTC+2 (CAT)

Kazungula District is a district of Zambia, located in Southern Province. The capital lies at Kazungula. As of the 2022 Zambian Census, the district had a population of 173,002 people.
