= Kazungula Bridge =

International crossing of the Zambezi River

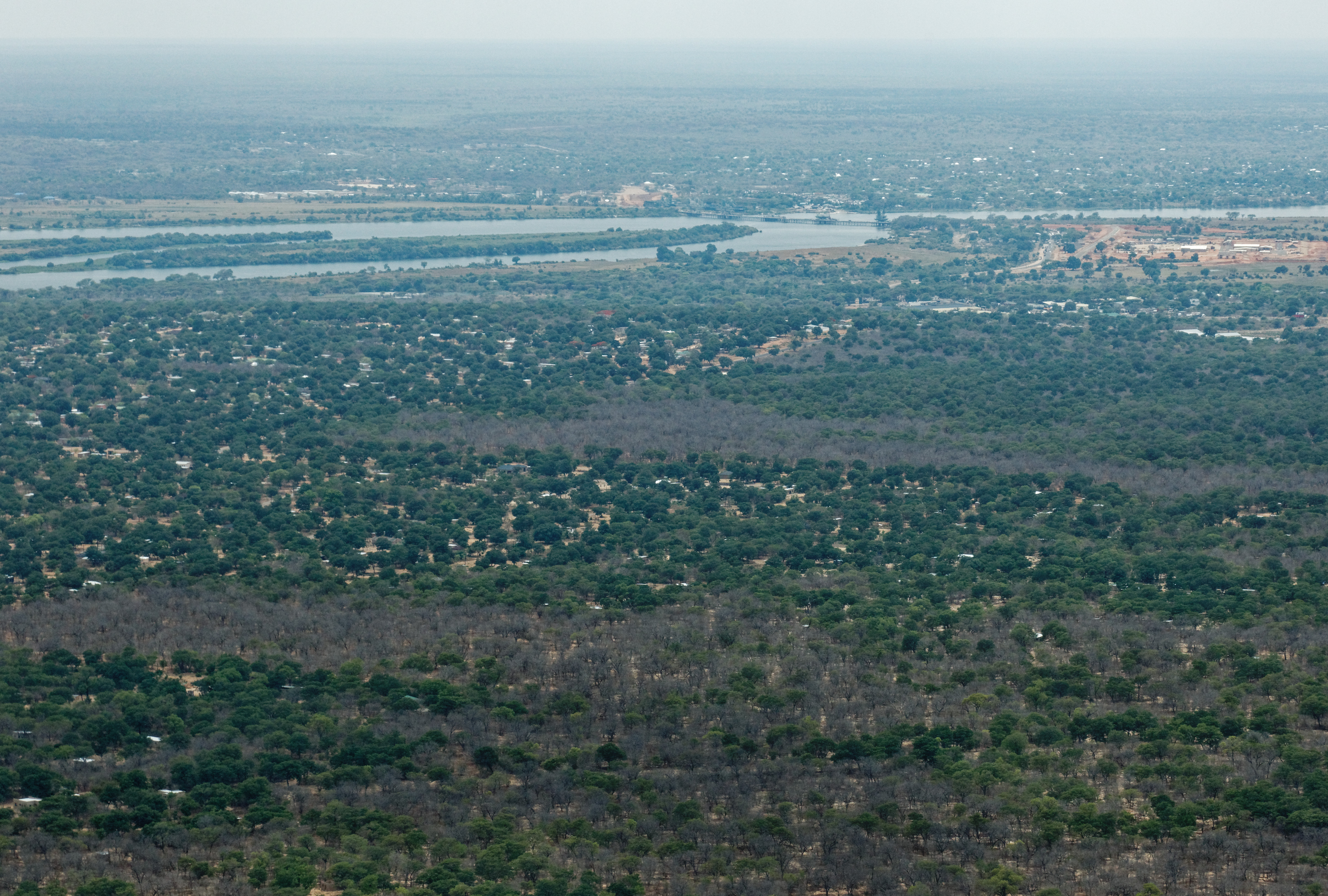
- Kazungula Bridge under construction over the Zambezi, at the duo-tripoint between Namibia and Zimbabwe, and crossing between Botswana and Zambia
- Coordinates: 17°47′28″S 25°15′45″E
- Carries: 2 lanes of A33 / M19 (1 each way), pedestrian traffic and railway line
- Crosses: Zambezi
- Locale: Kazungula, Botswana; Kazungula, Zambia
- Official name: Kazungula Bridge
- Maintained by: Ministry of Transport and Communications (Botswana); Ministry of Transport and Logistics (Zambia)

Characteristics
- Design: Cable-stayed bridge
- Total length: 923 m (3,028 ft)
- Longest span: 129 m (423 ft)
- No. of spans: 4
- Piers in water: 4
- No. of lanes: 2

Rail characteristics
- No. of tracks: 1
- Track gauge: 1,067 mm (3 ft 6 in)

History
- Construction start: 5 December 2014; 11 years ago
- Construction end: December 2020
- Construction cost: $259,300,000
- Inaugurated: 10 May 2021; 5 years ago
- Replaces: Kazungula Ferry

Location
- Interactive map of Kazungula Bridge

Kazungula Bridge is a road and rail bridge over the Zambezi River between the countries of Zambia and Botswana at the town of Kazungula. The 923-metre-long (3,028 ft) and 18.5-metre-wide (61 ft) bridge, which has a longest span of 129 metres (423 ft), links the town of Kazungula in Zambia with Botswana. Between the two traffic lanes and pedestrian footways there is a single railway line (although currently unconnected), which will eventually become a section in the proposed Mosetse–Kazungula–Livingstone Railway. The bridge construction, which took 7 years to complete, was overseen by the South Korean construction firm Daewoo E&C.

Before the bridge was opened for traffic in May 2021, direct traffic between the two countries was possible only by the Kazungula Ferry. The bridge takes advantage of the short 135-metre (440 ft) border the two countries share at the river, and is curved to avoid the nearby borders of Zimbabwe and Namibia.

== History ==
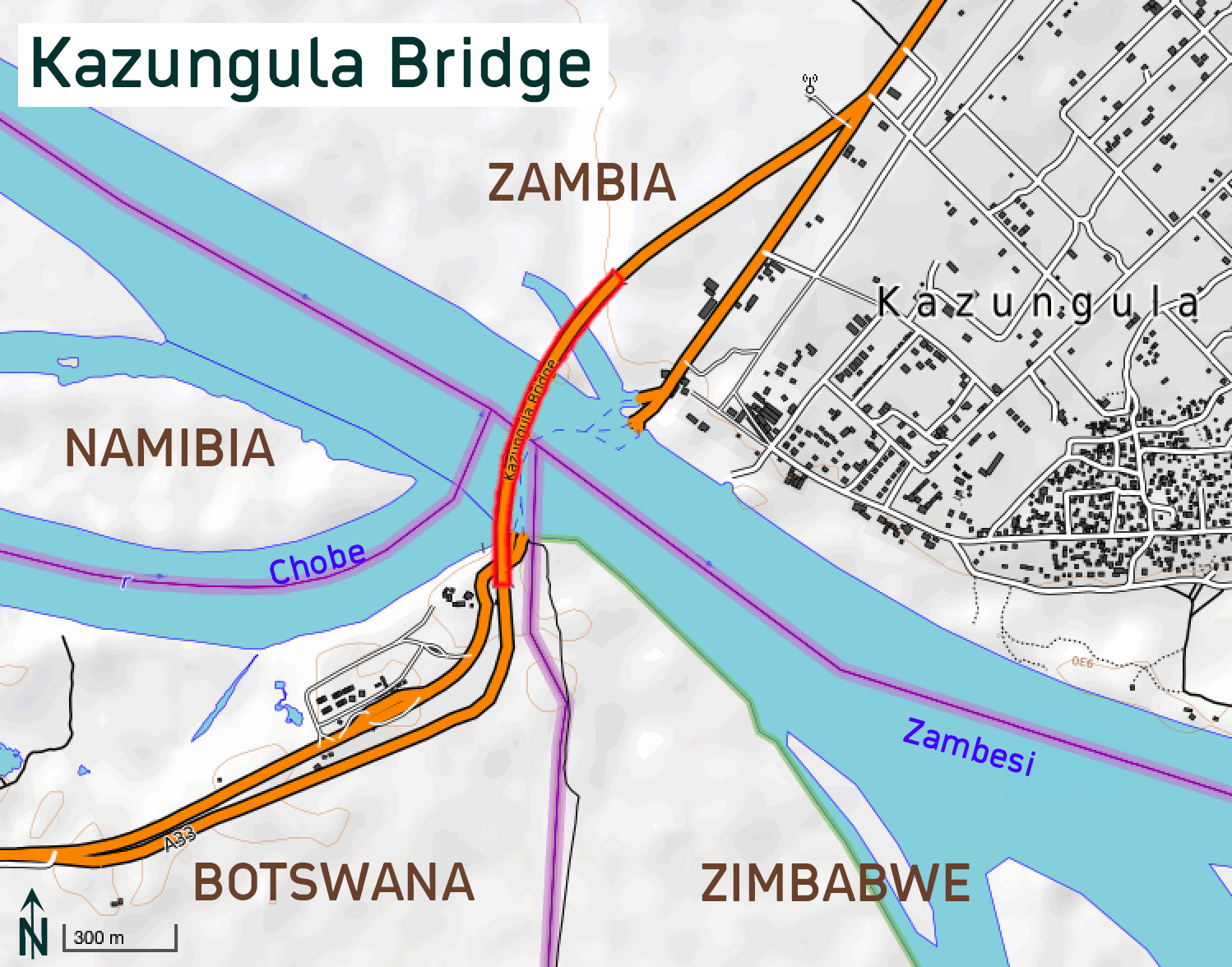
Map of the Kazungula Bridge in relation to the Kazungula, Botswana (southwest) and Kazungula, Zambia (northeast)

Before construction of the bridge, the river was traversed by two pontoons known as the Kazungula Ferry. In 2003, a severely overloaded Zambian truck capsized of one of the pontoons, drowning 18 people.

In August 2007 the governments of Zambia and Botswana announced a deal to construct a bridge to replace the existing ferry.

Construction of the US$259.3 million project, which includes international border facilities in Zambia and Botswana, officially began on 12 October 2014 and was completed on 10 May 2021 by South Korea's Daewoo E&C. Opening was delayed due to transport issues affected by the COVID-19 pandemic.

=== 2013 ===
In 2013, the governments of Botswana and Zambia jointly invited bids for the construction of the Kazungula Bridge at an estimated cost of US$260 million, as well as one-stop border facilities built on either side of the bridge. The project was stated to be financed partly through a $80-million loan signed in February 2013 between Zambia and the African Development Bank, as well as between Botswana and the Japan International Co-operation Agency (JICA). At this meeting, the project was announced to be completed in six years, and the bidder would need to supply consultancy services, design reviews, production of bidding documentation, supervision of works, and post-construction services.

=== 2014 ===
By the following year, 40 replacement houses for Lumbo villagers were ready to be distributed as initial construction work had already started. According to the District Commissioner of Kazungula District, Pascalina Musokotwane, the 40 houses and a school were handed over to the villagers in August 2014.

In March 2014, three companies were shortlisted for the construction bid out of the original twenty-six entries. The finalists were China Major Bridge Engineering Corporation, Daewoo E and C, and a Shimizu-Stefanuti Joint Venture.

In August 2014, Bernard Chiwala, Chief Executive of Zambia's Road Development Agency, stated that the whole construction process would be given to Botswana and would be jointly financed at a total cost of US$124.22 million and it was expected to be completed in four years, eight years shorter than previously stated. Under the agreement, the JICA would provide US$41.77 million, the ADB US$78.41, while the Government of Zambia would contribute US$1.57 million.

Construction of the Kazungula bridge started after the ground-breaking ceremony on the 12th of September 2014. At the ceremony held on the Botswana side of the Kazungula border, Zambian Vice–President Guy Scott and his Botswana counterpart, Ponatshego Kedikilwe welcomed press as well as stated that the cost would be US$259.3 million, be completed by 2018, and that the chosen contractor would be Daewoo Engineering and Construction.

=== 2018 ===
In 2018, the three presidents of Zimbabwe's Emmerson Mnangagwa, Seretse Khama of Botswana, and Edgar Lungu of Zambia, inspected the progress on the Kazungula Bridge. During this meeting, it was agreed for Zimbabwe to be part of the phase II of the project.

The involvement of Zimbabwe was revealed during a press briefing by Botswana Transport and Communication Minister Kitso Mokaila, Zimbabwean Transport and Infrastructure Development Minister Joram Gumbo, and Zambian Housing and Infrastructure Development Minister Ronald Chitotela.

=== 2019 ===
In March 2019, construction stopped after Daewoo Engineering and Construction failed to be paid for its services by the Zambian government. Daewoo stated the issue has led to an industrial strike by the employees, and Administration Manager Hong Seouk Park stated that these financial constraints have made it increasingly difficult to maintain the company's running costs. Botswana had made payment for the project but Zambia had not, meaning a total of US$14.84 million was owed.

In May 2019, President Edgar Lungu of Zambia stated the project was "78% complete" and is optimistic that the project would be completed on schedule.

By November 2019, consultant Mr. Kobamelo Kgoboko said the project was 91.92% complete, with the Botswana side being 98.7% complete and the Zambian side was 80.5% complete. It was also stated that 6 of the 8 pylons had been completed. However, the project was announced to be pushed back to June 2020, meaning the project would open 10 months behind schedule.

=== 2020 ===
In October 2020, the Botswanan Ministry of Transport and Communications stated that bridge and approach ramps were complete, with the Botswanan border post being 98.44% complete at a cost of US$38.4million, and the Zambia border post being 99.40% complete at a cost of US$13.1 million.

In December, Zambia's Minister for Housing and Infrastructure Development Vincent Mwale stated a total of US$82.3m had been paid by Zambia, with an additional US$73.7m being released in December and US$8.7m to be paid by the end of the year. These statements were in response to accusations that the Zambian Government had failed to pay its dues and would not honor the outstanding amount owed to the contractor. Vincent Mwale went on to say that he "would like to put it on record that the assertions currently being circulated via social media, purporting that the Zambian Government has failed to pay its dues and will not honor the outstanding amount owed to the Contractor, are not correct".

=== 2021 ===
On 10 May 2021, the bridge officially opened.

During the opening ceremony, Botswanan and Zambian officials alongside Botswana President Mokgweetsi Masisi and Zambian President Edgar Lungu congratulated the completion of the project. The Democratic Republic of Congo (DRC) President Felix Tshisekedi, Mozambican President Filipe Nyusi, and Zimbabwean President Emmerson Mnangagwa were also present.

=== 2024 ===
The section of railway track across the Kazungula Bridge is currently isolated from both the Zambian and Botswanan railway networks, but is planned to be incorporated into the proposed Mosetse–Kazungula–Livingstone Railway.

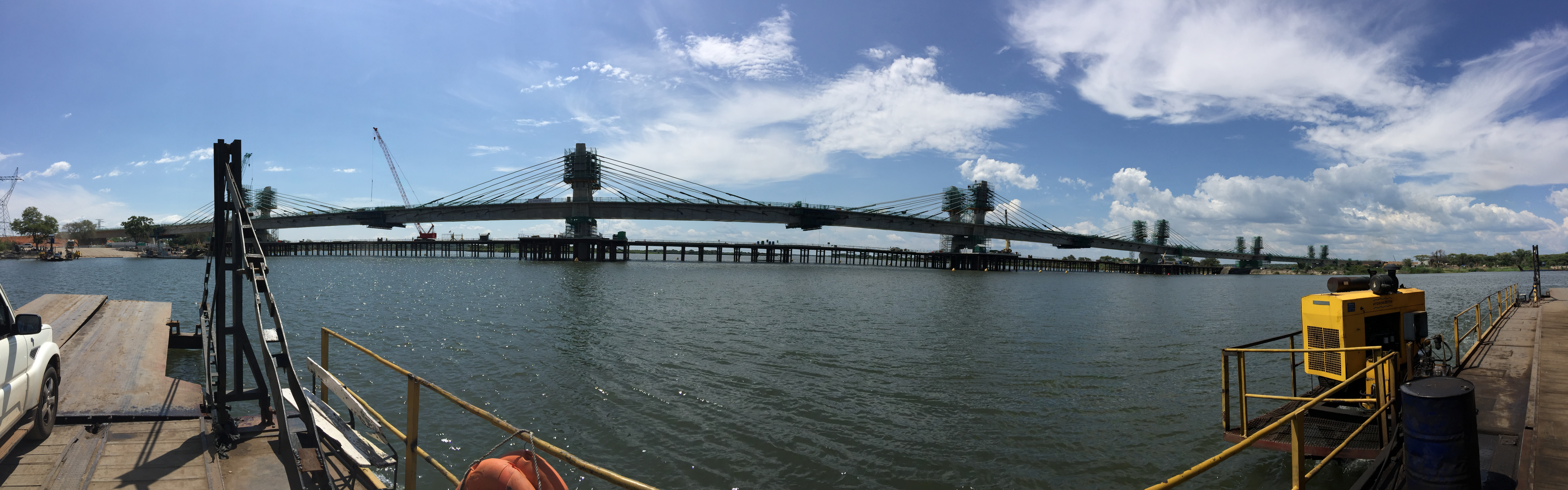
Panorama of the Kazungula bridge from a ferry

== See also ==
- List of crossings of the Zambezi River
- Kazungula Ferry
- List of international bridges
