= Sesheke =

- Town
- Location in Zambia
- Coordinates: 17°28′00″S 24°18′00″E
- Country: Zambia
- Province: Western Province
- District: Sesheke District
- Time zone: UTC+2 (CAT)

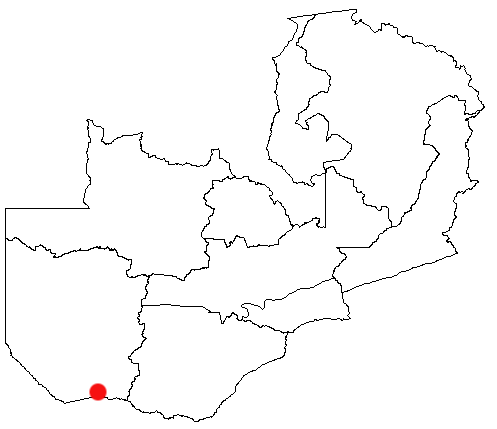
Location of Sesheke in Zambia

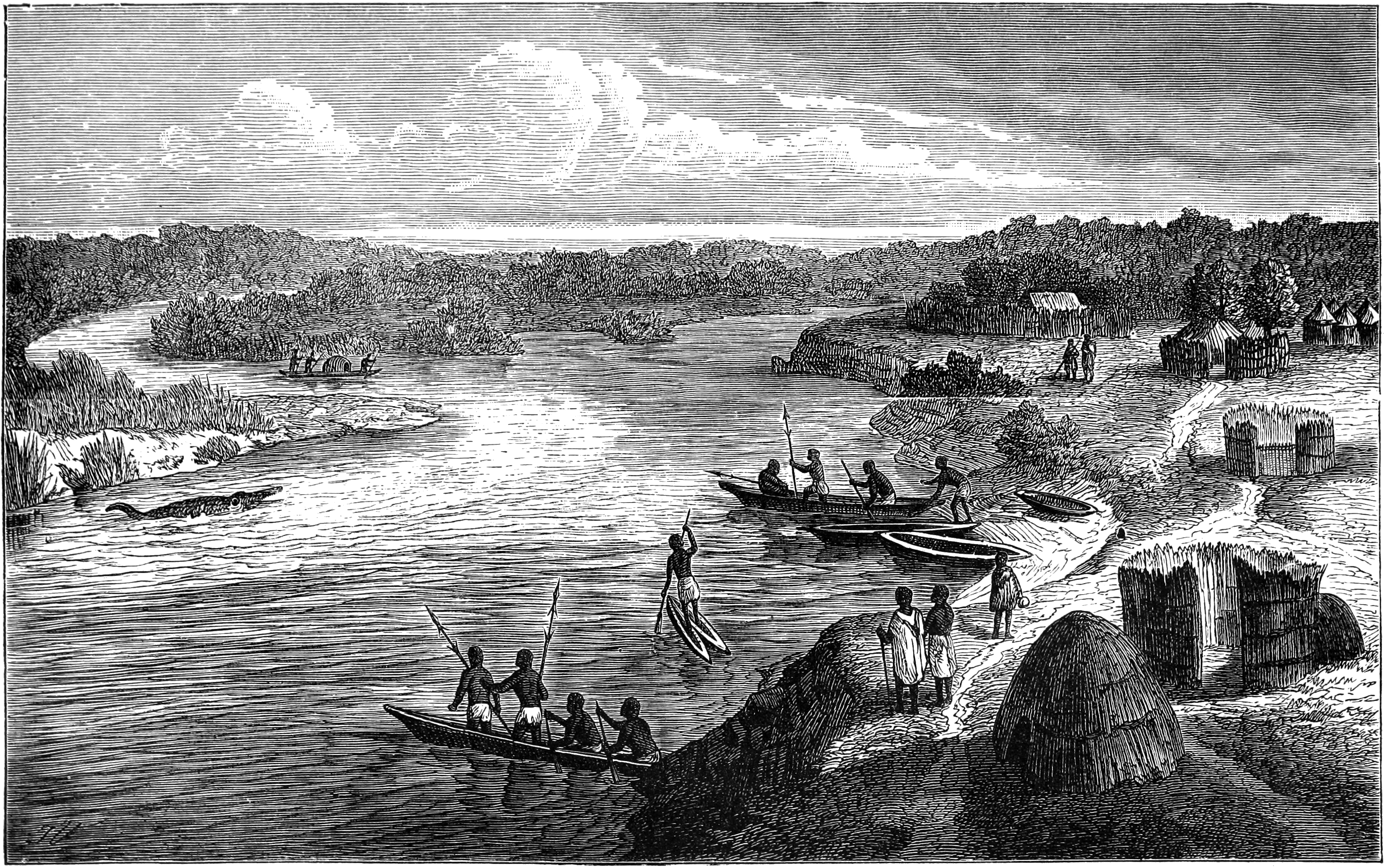
Port of Sesheke in 1870s

Sesheke is a border town in the Western Province of Zambia, in a district of the same name. It lies on the northern bank of the Zambezi River which forms the border with Namibia's Caprivi Strip at that point.

The Katima Mulilo Bridge, completed in May 2004, spans the river here, connecting Sesheke with the Namibian border town of Katima Mulilo on the southern bank of the Zambezi. The M10 road, which connects Sesheke to Livingstone and the Victoria Falls 200 km to the east, was upgraded in 2004. The new bridge and road were financed by German donor bank Kreditanstalt für Wiederaufbau and were the last missing link in the "Trans Caprivi Corridor" (today known as the Walvis Bay-Ndola-Lubumbashi Development Road). This 2500 km long asphalt road now connects Zambia's Copperbelt with Namibia's sea port (Walvis Bay). As a direct result, the amount of road freight traffic has greatly increased.

Improved road access and the construction of new lodges and other tourist facilities have also increased the number of tourists passing through Sesheke on their way to the Victoria Falls, to the Sioma Ngwezi National Park 50 km west of the town, or to the upper Zambezi and the Barotse Floodplain.

The M10 road also connects Sesheke to Sioma, Senanga and Mongu 300 km north-north-west.
