= C28 road (Namibia) =

Road in Namibia

C28 road

Major junctions
- East end: A1 / B1 / B6 at Windhoek
- C32 near Tsaobis Leopard Park
- West end: B2 east of Swakopmund

Location
- Country: Namibia

Highway system
- Transport in Namibia
← C27	→ C29

C28 is an secondary road in central Namibia. It is 319 kilometres (198 mi) long and connects Windhoek to Swakopmund via the Bosua Pass. The C28 rises up to an altitude of 1,924 metres (6,312 ft) above sea level and crosses the Namib Desert and the Namib-Naukluft National Park.

The C28 is the shortest route from the capital to the coast. Because it is untarred except for a few kilometers outside Windhoek, and because the Bosua Pass section (gradient 1:5) can become impassable for sedans, the road is not well travelled. The B2 road is now the main route used to reach Swakopmund.
