= C32 road (Namibia) =

Secondary route in Namibia

C32 road

Route information
- Length: 81 km (50 mi)

Major junctions
- North end: B2 Karibib
- South end: C28 near Tsaobis Nature Park

Location
- Country: Namibia

Highway system
- Transport in Namibia
← C31	→ C33

The C32 is a secondary route in Namibia that runs from Karibib in the north to the C28 junction in the south, near the Tsaobis Nature Park.
