= B10 road (Namibia) =

National highway of Namibia

B10 road

- Map of the B10.

Route information
- Maintained by Roads Authority Namibia
- Length: 439 km (273 mi)

Major junctions
- West end: B1 near Oshikango
- B15 near Mpungu; B15 near Nkurenkuru
- East end: B8 in Rundu

Location
- Country: Namibia

Highway system
- Transport in Namibia
← B8	→ B11

The B10 is a national road in northern Namibia, running from west to east from the Ohangwena Region to Rundu directly along the Angola Border.
