= Transport in Namibia =

This article deals with the system of transport in Namibia, both public and private.

== General ==
=== History ===
The beginnings of organised travel and transport routes in the territory of South West Africa, today Namibia, have not yet been established. This is due to the lack of any written records relating to roads prior to the twilight of the 19th century. Archaeological work has dated one stretch of road in the south-western Brandberg Massif to c. 1250 AD. Although no other such early examples have been found, it is certain that this road was not the only one of its kind.

The first permanent road, established for ox wagons, was built at the initiative of Heinrich Schmelen, Rhenish missionary in Bethanie in the early 19th century. It led from Bethanie to Angra Pequeña, today the town of Lüderitz, and was intended to serve the natural harbour there in order to become independent of the Cape Colony.

== Road ==
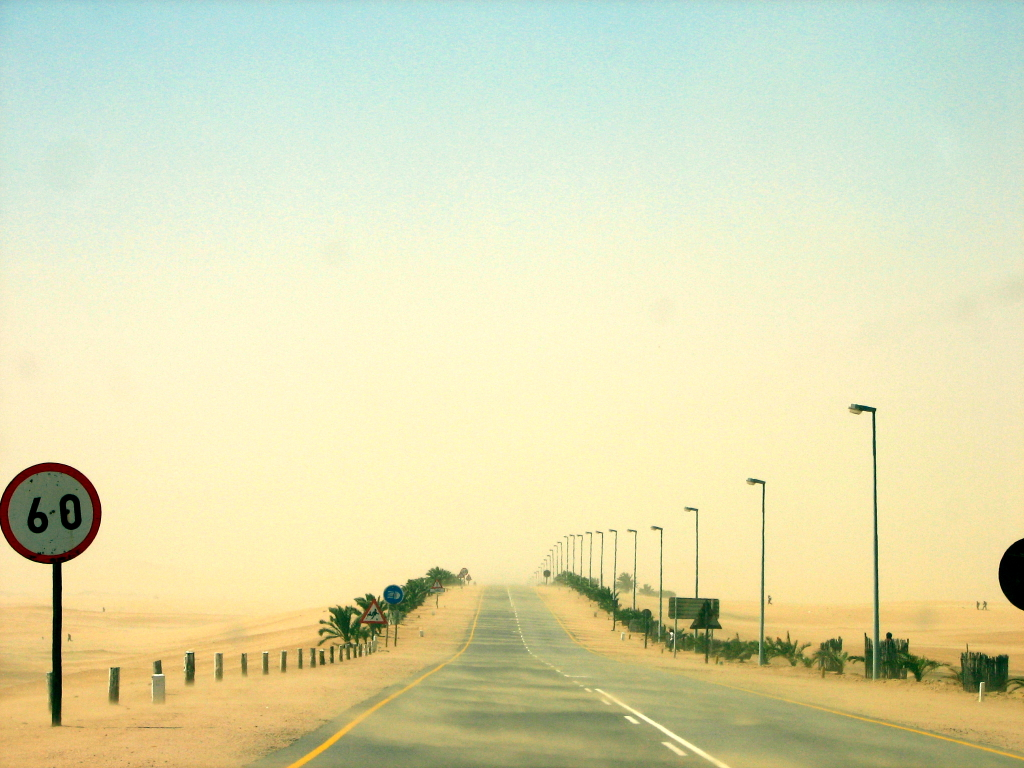
The B2 between Walvis Bay and Swakopmund. Windy conditions and the proximity of sand dunes lead to reduced visibility, and sand covering the tarmac

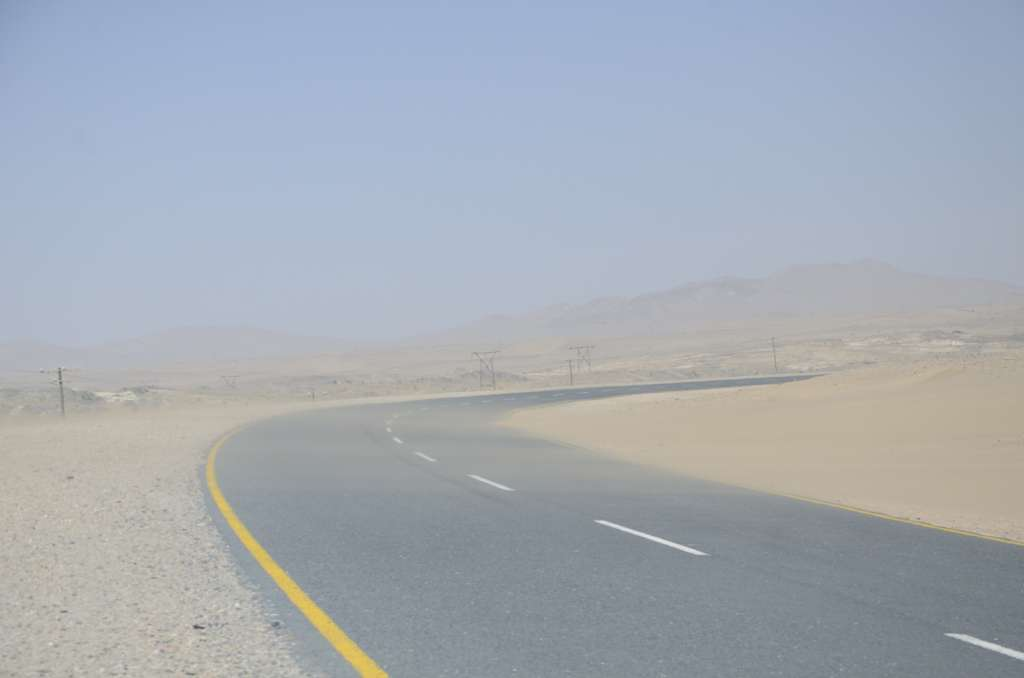
B4 highway near Luderitz

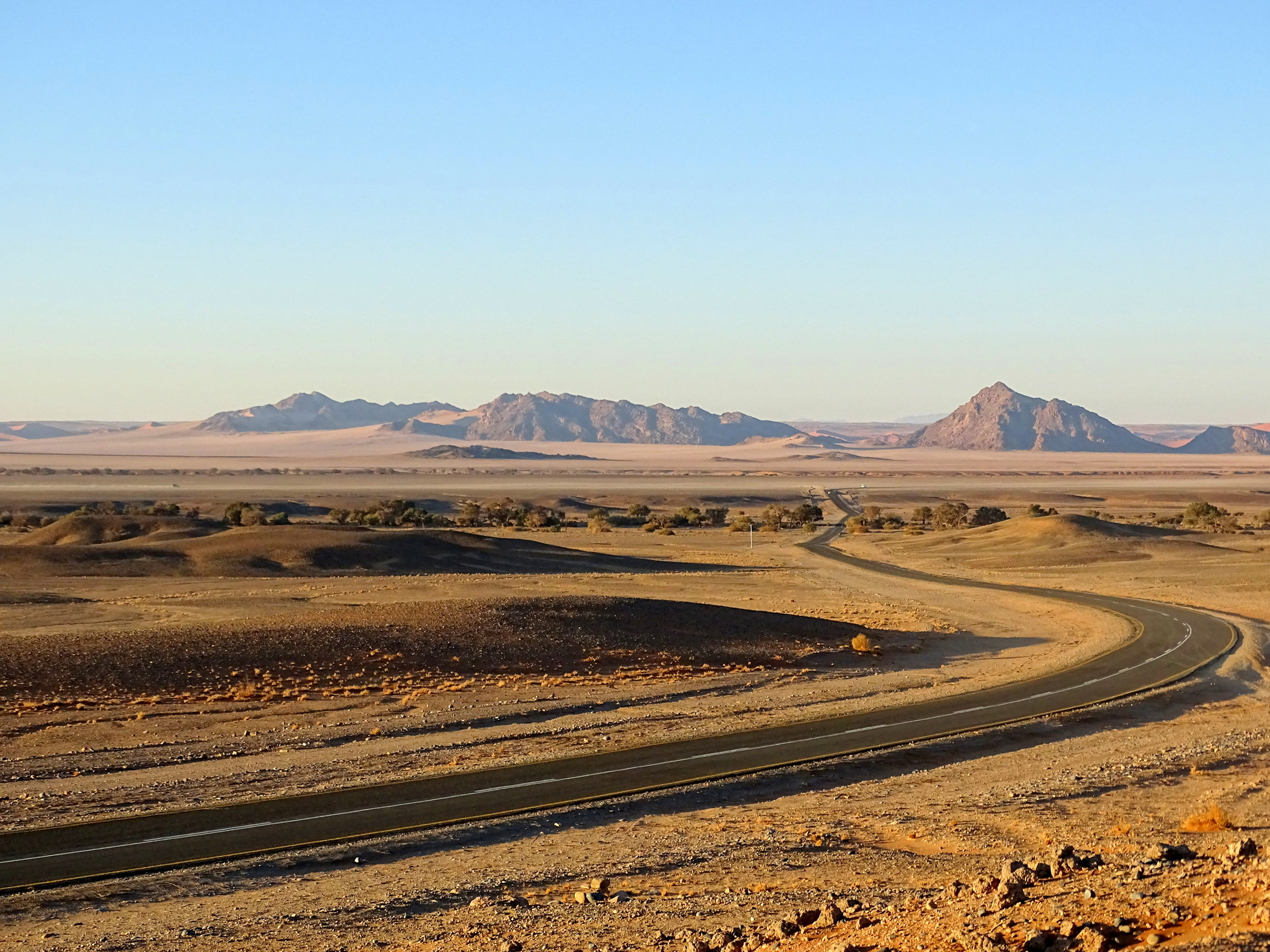
Point of view on the D826 road to Sossusvlei.

Namibia's road network is regarded as one of the best on the continent; road construction and maintenance adheres to international standards. The country's 48,875.27 km roads (2017) are administered by the Roads Authority, a state-owned enterprise established by Act 17 of 1999. Due to low traffic volumes the majority of roads are not tarred. The distribution of road surfaces is:

- 6,664 kilometres (4,141 mi) standard bitumen road
- 412 kilometres (256 mi) low-volume bitumen road. These roads have the same base layer as gravel roads but are covered with a thin layer of bitumen to reduce maintenance cost and dust formation.
- 25,710 kilometres (15,980 mi) standard gravel road, covered with imported gravel.
- 11,460 kilometres (7,120 mi) earth-graded road. These roads are built by clearing the vegetation and blading the surface. Compaction is achieved by the traffic using the road. Some of these roads are not graded at all but just consist of earth or sand tracks separated by vegetation. These tracks are in use where a daily usage of less than five vehicles is expected.
- 288 kilometres (179 mi) salt road. These roads consist of concentrated salt water and gypsum-rich material. They are only built near the Atlantic coast inside the mist belt.

=== Roads by region (2017) ===
Region	Bitumen (km)	Gravel (km)	Salt (km)	Earth (km)	Others (km)	Total (km)	Kilometers per 1000 km^{2}
Erongo	466.9	1748.3	269.9	1025.7	14.2	3524.98	55.5
Hardap	654.7	4566.4	0,0	1358.9	0.0	6597.95	59.9
Karas	1314.7	4989.0	5.0	1347.9	2.1	7658.62	47.6
Kavango East	344.4	465.9	0.0	673.2	82.5	1656.95	64.7
Kavango West	428.0	218.8	0.0	629.3	24.3	1300.41	56.0
Khomas	361.8	1729.0	0.0	666.2	70.9	2827.85	76.8
Kunene	515.5	2644.1	25.0	1524.5	186.6	4895.68	33.9
Ohangwena	359.2	316.9	0.0	350.2	303.5	1329.71	125.4
Omaheke	445.4	2974.1	0.0	2055.0	33.6	5508.09	73.8
Omusati	726.4	486.8	0.0	750.6	261.8	2225.58	163.2
Oshana	129.2	261.7	0.0	178.2	182.6	751.78	141.8
Oshikoto	513.3	934.2	0.0	328.9	12.6	1789.06	67.3
Otjozondjupa	1137.6	4454.0	0.0	1702.6	66.1	7360.35	69.9
Zambezi	504.7	257.4	0.0	697.4	79.8	1539.26	78.8

The major highways in Namibia are as follows:

- A1 (freeway) from Windhoek to Okahandja, 74 km (46 mi).
- B1 in two discontinuous sections, first running 802 km (498 mi) from Noordoewer (South African border) to the southern terminus of the A1 in Windhoek, then resuming at the northern terminus of the A1 in Okahandja and running 665 km (413 mi) to Oshikango (Angolan border). Combined, the two sections have a length of 1,467 km (912 mi).
- B2 from Walvis Bay to Okahandja, 320 km (200 mi).
- B3 from Ariamsvlei (South African border) to Grünau, 179 km (111 mi).
- B4 from Lüderitz to Keetmanshoop, 334 km (208 mi).
- B6 from Windhoek to Buitepos (Botswana border), 318 km (198 mi).
- B8 from Otavi via Katima Mulilo to Ngoma (Botswana border), 929 km (577 mi). This is the road to the caprivi strip.
- B10 from the Ohangwena Region to Rundu, 439 km (273 mi).
- B11 from Nkurenkuru to Katwitwi (Angolan border), 14 km (8.7 mi).
- B14 from Grootfontein to Gobabis, 389 km (242 mi).
- B15 from Tsumeb to Mpungu, 133 km (83 mi).

=== Road accidents ===
In 2018, there were about 393,062 cars registered in Namibia (169,911 in the capital Windhoek). Namibia has a relatively high prevalence of road accidents, compared to its sparse population. In 2011, 491 people died in 2,846 crashes. Causes are often speeding and reckless driving, as well as general non-observance of traffic rules. Stray animals are also a major cause of accidents, particularly in the Kavango Region.

== Railway ==
Rail transport in Namibia is operated on a 2,687-kilometre network by TransNamib.

Map of the rail network of Namibia

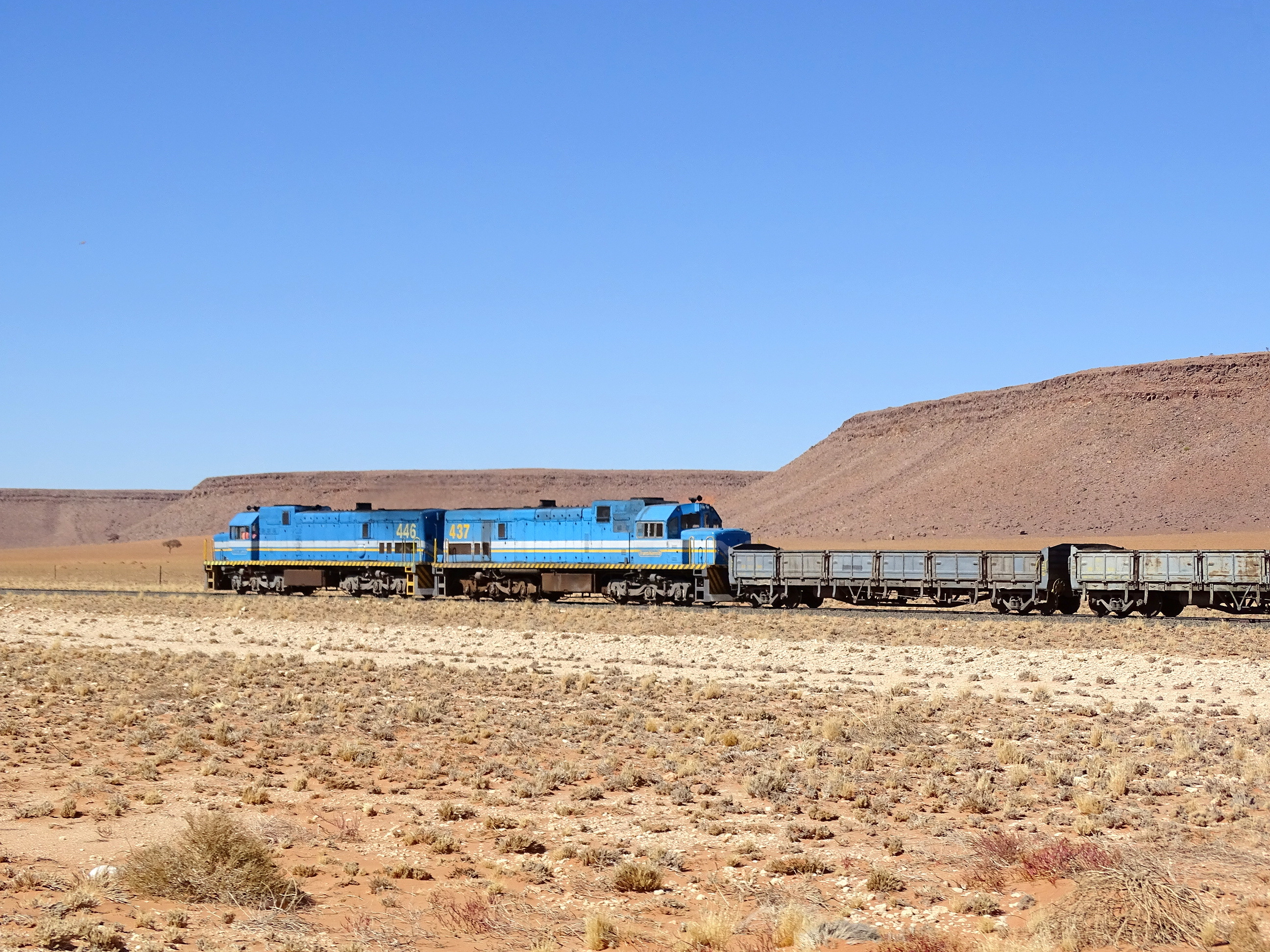
TransNamib train near Kolmanskop.

=== Railway links to adjacent countries ===
- Angola - There is currently no rail connection to Angola, although an agreement has been signed for a link. Angola uses the same gauge,1,067 mm (3 ft 6 in), as Namibia. (Rail transport in Angola)
- Botswana - There is currently no rail link with Botswana, though the two countries use the same gauge. As of February 2011, construction on a Trans-Kalahari rail link between Botswanan coal fields and Walvis Bay was expected to begin in a year and a half. (Rail transport in Botswana)
- South Africa - There is a rail connection to South Africa; the two countries use the same 1,067 mm (3 ft 6 in) gauge. (Rail transport in South Africa)
- Zambia - There is currently no rail-link with Zambia, though the two countries use the same gauge. As of February 2011, there has been some talk of extending rail to the Zambian border. (Rail transport in Zambia)

== Ports and harbours ==
=== Atlantic Ocean ===
Walvis Bay is Namibia's largest commercial port, operated by the Namibian Ports Authority (Namport), and serves as a gateway for landlocked countries in the SADC region via the Trans-Kalahari and Trans-Caprivi corridors. In August 2019 a new container terminal, built by the China Harbour Engineering Company on about 40 hectares of reclaimed land at a cost of some US$400 million, was inaugurated, raising the port's container capacity from around 350,000 to 750,000 TEU a year.

- Walvis Bay - railhead
- Lüderitz - railhead

== Merchant marine ==
none (2002, 1999 est.)

== Airports ==
Windhoek Hosea Kutako International Airport is the main international airport in the country. Two others international airports are Walvis Bay Airport and Eros Airport in Windhoek.

Airports - with paved runways
Passengers	Number	
Passengers	2002	1999 est.
over 3,047 m	2	2
2,438 to 3,047 m	2	2
1,524 to 2,437 m	13	15
914 to 1,523 m	4	3
Total	21	22

Airports - with unpaved runways
Passengers	Number	
Passengers	2002	1999 est.
2,438 to 3,047 m	2	2
1,524 to 2,437 m	22	21
914 to 1,523 m	71	69
under 914 m	19	21
Total	114	113
