= B11 road (Namibia) =

National highway of Namibia

B11 road

- Map of the B11.

Route information
- Maintained by Roads Authority Namibia
- Length: 14 km (8.7 mi)

Major junctions
- South end: B10 near Nkurenkuru
- North end: Angolan border near Katwitwi

Location
- Country: Namibia

Highway system
- Transport in Namibia
← B10	→ B14

The B11 is a national road in Namibia, running since 2013 from the B10 near Nkurenkuru to Katwitwi. The road, together with the B10 and B15 from Tsumeb, cost 910 million NAD. Construction has been carried out in three phases since 2009 by the Namibian Roads Contractor Company (RCC) and the China Henan International Cooperation Group.
