= C48 =

C48 or C-48 may refer to:

- C-48 (Michigan county highway)
- C48 road (Namibia)
- Bill C-48, various legislation of the Parliament of Canada
- Caldwell 48, a spiral galaxy
- Douglas C-48, an American military transport
- Four Knights Game, a chess opening
- HMS Gambia (C48), a Fiji-class light cruiser of the Royal Navy
