= Trans-Kalahari Corridor =

International highway in Africa

The Trans-Kalahari Corridor is a paved highway corridor that provides a direct route from the port of Walvis Bay and Windhoek in central Namibia, through Botswana, to Pretoria in Gauteng province in South Africa. It initially cost approximately 850 million Namibian dollars (US$115 million) and was officially opened in 1998.

The corridor also includes railway lines from Walvis Bay as far as Gobabis in Namibia, and from Johannesburg as far as Lobatse in Botswana. Connecting the two railway lines has been discussed since 2010, and an agreement between the two countries was signed in 2014, but the project has since become economically unfeasible.

The Maputo Corridor provides an onwards connection from Gauteng to Maputo in Mozambique. Together these corridors form a unique road connection between Walvis Bay on the Atlantic and Maputo on the Indian Ocean; the connected regions are also known as the Walvis Bay–Botswana–Gauteng–Maputo development corridor.

== Route ==
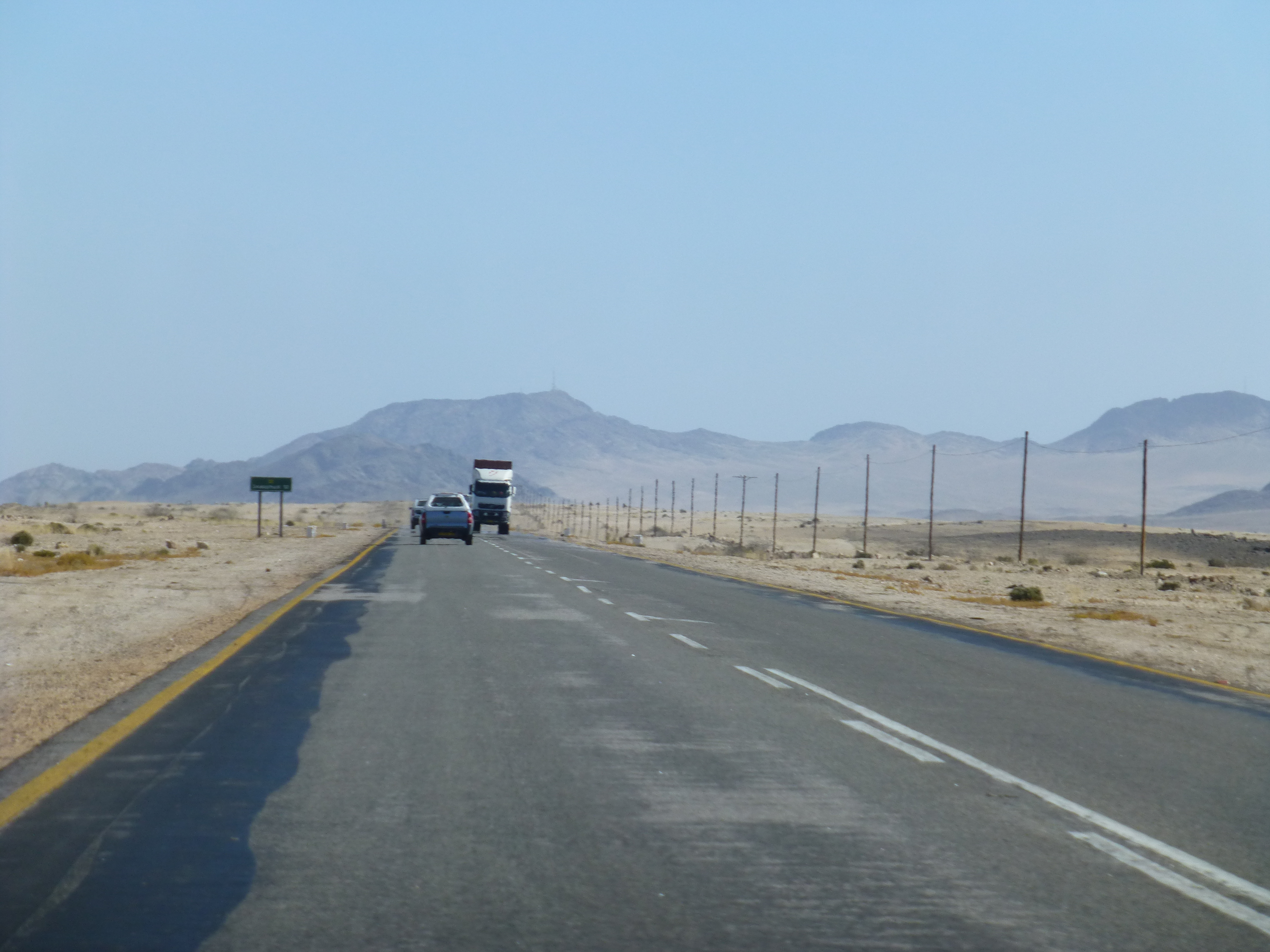
The B2 in Namibia, between Windhoek and Swakopmund

The route Walvis Bay–Windhoek–Lobatse–Pretoria–Maputo is route number 40 in the Southern African Development Community Regional Trunk Road Network.

The corridor begins in the coastal town of Walvis Bay, heading northwards as the B2 road to the coastal town of Swakopmund (a distance of 35 km), where it turns eastwards. It heads eastwards from Swakopmund, through Karibib, to the town of Okahandja (a distance of 290 km), where it reaches a junction with the B1 road. At this junction, the B2 ends and the corridor becomes the B1 southwards. The entire section from Walvis Bay to Okahandja is shared with the Walvis Bay-Ndola-Lubumbashi Development Road (Trans-Caprivi Corridor).

From Okahandja, it heads southwards as the A1 road (that is the freeway section of the B1 road) for 70 km to the city of Windhoek (capital of Namibia) where it reaches a junction with the B6 road. At this junction, the corridor becomes the B6 eastwards. The section from Okahandja to Windhoek is shared with the Tripoli–Cape Town Highway.

From Windhoek, the corridor heads eastwards as the B6 for 315 km, through Gobabis, to the border town of Buitepos, where it crosses the national boundary in an easterly direction to enter Botswana and become the A2 road. From Buitepos, the corridor heads east-south-east as the A2 for 750 km, through Jwaneng, to the border town of Lobatse. Immediately after Lobatse, at Skilpadshek, the corridor crosses the national boundary in an easterly direction to enter South Africa and become the N4 road (Platinum Highway).

From Skilpadshek, the corridor heads eastwards as the N4 for 285 km, through Rustenburg, to Pretoria (Tshwane; Capital of South Africa), where the Trans-Kalahari Corridor ends at an interchange with the N1 road.

The N4 then continues eastwards from Pretoria to reach the Mozambique border at Komatipoort (a distance of 415 km), as part of the Maputo Corridor, completing the route from Walvis Bay to Maputo.

== Trans-Kalahari Railway ==
The Trans-Kalahari Railway is a planned railway expected to be built alongside the Trans-Kalahari Corridor.

The railway is expected to mostly be a freight haulage line due to the path focusing on connecting industry rather than population centres. The line is predominantly aimed for coal transport from the Mmamabula coal fields to the Walvis Bay port, with an estimate that it would be exporting 90 million tonnes of coal each year from Botswana to India and China.

The route will follow the Trans-Kalahari Corridor (TKC) highway past Gobabis to Omitara, west to Okahandja, and onwards to Walvis Bay. In Botswana, the line shall start at the Mmamabula coal fields connecting to the existing railway to Rasesa, going west and passing north of Molepolole and east of Letlhakeng, joining the Molepolole-Kang road and through to the Mamuno border post.
