= A1 road (Namibia) =

National highway of Namibia

A1 road

- Map of the A1

Route information
- Maintained by Roads Authority Namibia
- Length: 74 km (46 mi)
- Existed: 2017–present

Major junctions
- South end: B1 / B9 in Windhoek
- B6 / C28 in Windhoek
- North end: B1 / B2 near Okahandja

Location
- Country: Namibia
- Major cities: Windhoek, Okahandja

Highway system
- Transport in Namibia
← C49	→ B1

The A1 is a national highway in Namibia. The 74 kilometres (46 mi) stretch of road between Windhoek and Okahandja is the only A-rated road in Namibia. Consisting of freeway for its entire length, it came into existence in 2017 when freeway sections of the B1 were redesignated A1 in accordance with new standards of the Roads Authority Namibia. The entirety of the A1 forms part of the Trans-Kalahari Corridor and, together with the B1, also forms part of the Tripoli-Cape Town Highway.

== Route ==
At its southern end, the A1 freeway transitions from the B1 in Windhoek's Hochland Park district, at an interchange with the B6 to the city centre, Hosea Kutako International Airport and Gobabis, and the C28 road to Swakopmund. The route follows the Western Bypass, built in the 1970s. It then runs north out of Windhoek on freeway sections built in the 2010s through Elisenheim, Brakwater and Teufelsbach to Osona; the distance from Hochland Park to Osona being 53 kilometres (33 mi).

The freeway currently ends at Okahandja, with the road designation transitioning back to B1. The final 21 kilometres (13 mi) to Okahandja was opened to traffic on November 1, 2024, which increased the A1's final length to 74 kilometres (46 mi).

== History ==
The origins of the A1 freeway are in Windhoek's Western Bypass, constructed during South African administration in the 1970s with the section north of the B6/C28 interchange being of freeway standards. The B1, then running through central Windhoek, was shifted to run along the Western Bypass upon its opening.

In the early 2010s, a project commenced to upgrade the B1 between the northern end of the Western Bypass and Okahandja, to be constructed in four sections. Phase 1 and Phase 2 were carried out as renovations of the existing B1, with Phase 1 rehabilitating the non-freeway section of the Western Bypass between Kleine Kuppe and the B6/C28 interchange (including construction of the second carriageway, which was not done during the initial construction of the Western Bypass), and Phase 2 rehabilitating the freeway section of the Western Bypass up to Brakwater.

Phase 3 entailed upgrading the existing B1 between Brakwater and the Dobra River to freeway standards. Construction commenced in January 2014 and was officially opened by the Roads Authority Namibia in April 2017. Upon its opening, all freeway sections of the B1 were redesignated A1 in accordance with new standards of the Roads Authority Namibia, and signage along the route was updated to reflect the redesignation.

Phase 4 was split into two parts, Phase 4A and Phase 4B. Phase 4A continued upgrading 37 kilometres (23 mi) of the B1 to the A1 from the Dobra River to Osona, and was completed in September 2019. Phase 4B entails the construction of a new route from Osona, bypassing Okahandja, and terminating at the existing junction of the B1 with the B2 to Swakopmund; it was opened in November 2024.

== See also ==
- Transport in Namibia
