= Guinas Constituency =

Electoral constituency in the Oshikoto region of northern Namibia

Coordinates: 18°37′S 17°10′E

Guinas constituency (red) in the Oshikoto Region

Guinas Constituency is an electoral constituency in the Oshikoto Region of Namibia. It had 8,435 inhabitants in 2004 and 4,210 registered voters in 2020. Guinas consists of the rural area surrounding the mining town of Tsumeb. Larger settlements in the Guinas constituency are Oshivelo and Tsintsabis.

The constituency is named after Lake Guinas.

== Politics ==
Guinas constituency is traditionally a stronghold of the South West Africa People's Organization (SWAPO) party.

=== Regional elections ===
In the 2004 regional election SWAPO candidate Isack Gomachab received 2,030 of the 3,094 votes cast. In the 2015 local and regional elections the SWAPO candidate won uncontested and became councillor after no opposition party nominated a candidate.

The SWAPO candidate also won the 2020 regional election by a landslide. Elias Marthinu received 1,268 votes, well ahead of the only opposition candidate Pinehas Heita of the Independent Patriots for Change (IPC), a party formed in August 2020, with 95 votes.

=== National elections ===
In the Namibian general election, 2009, Hifikepunye Pohamba received approximately 77% of the votes in Guinas. Hidipo Hamutenya finished in second place with approximately 10% of the vote.
