= Tsintsabis =

- Proclaimed settlement
- Location in Namibia
- Coordinates: 18°46′S 17°58′E
- Country: Namibia
- Region: Oshikoto Region
- Constituency: Guinas Constituency
- Proclaimed: 2020

Population (2016)
  - Total: 4,000
- Time zone: UTC+2 (South African Standard Time)

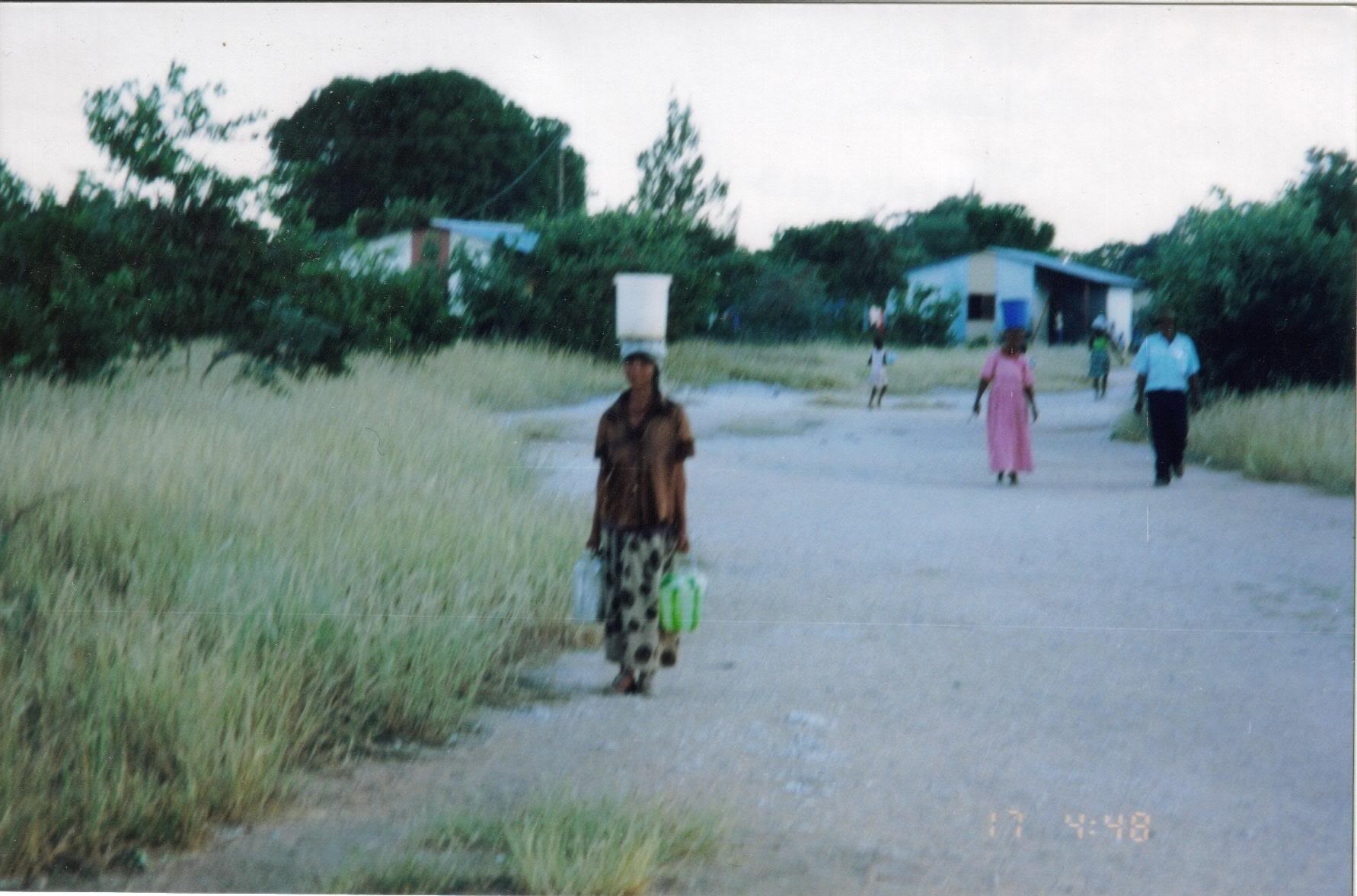
Carrying water from village well to home in Tsintsabis

Tsintsabis is a settlement of about 4,000 inhabitants in the Oshikoto Region of Namibia. It is situated c. 65 kilometres (40 mi) northeast of Tsumeb and belongs to the Guinas electoral constituency. The settlement features a clinic and a police station.

Tsintsabis was proclaimed a settlement in 2020. Until then it was situated on farm land, some of which has been obtained by government to resettle landless people. The area is inhabited predominantly by San people but also by Damara, Ovambo and people from the Kavango Region.

== Development and infrastructure ==
Tsintsabis is situated on the B15 national road from Tsumeb to the Katwitwi border post with Angola.

The place is riddled with poverty and alcohol abuse. Apart from farms surrounding the settlement there are no job opportunities such that many of the residents live on government handouts. Tsintsabis Combined School is the only school in the area. It offers classes up to Grade 10. The school had had bad pass rates in the past.
