= Aus, Namibia =

Aus
- Settlement
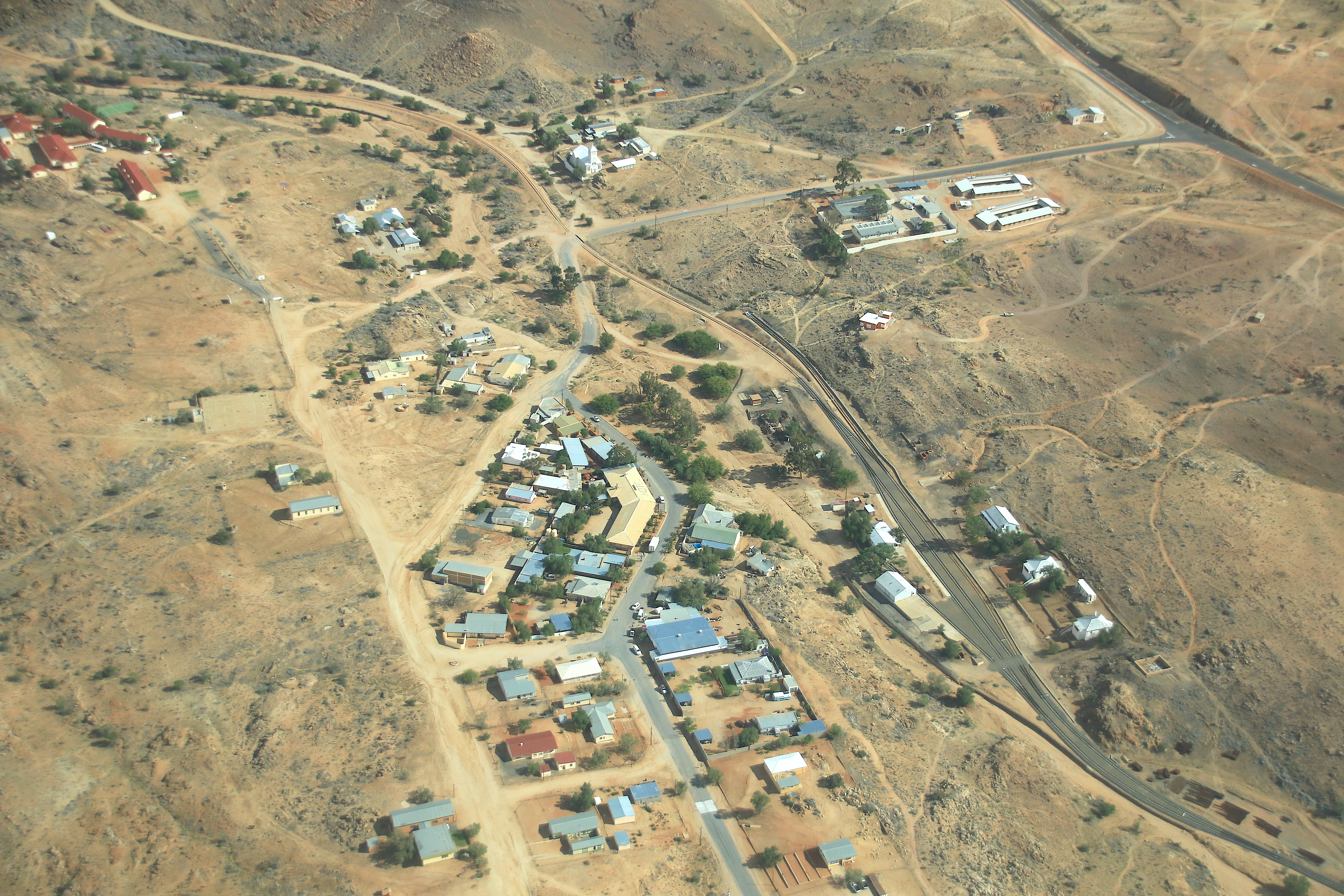
- Aerial view of Aus (2019)

- Location in Namibia
- Coordinates: 26°40′S 16°16′E
- Country: Namibia
- Region: ǁKaras Region
- Constituency: ǃNamiǂNûs Constituency

Population (2011)
  - Total: 1,066
- Time zone: UTC+2 (South African Standard Time)
- Climate: BWk

Aus is a settlement in the ǁKaras Region of southern Namibia. It lies on a railway line and the B4 national road, 230 km (140 mi) west of Keetmanshoop and about 125 km (78 mi) east of Lüderitz and belongs to the ǃNamiǂNûs electoral constituency. Trains from Keetmanshoop now end their journey at the village but formerly continued on to Lüderitz. The settlement is small but has a number of amenities including a hotel, police station, shop and garage. It is located in the Aus Mountains above the plains of the Namib Desert. The climate is usually hot and arid but snow has been recorded in the winter of 1963, and the area features the coldest winters recorded in Namibia.

The area west of Aus is noted for its herd of feral horses living in the desert. Their origin is uncertain but today there is a population of between 150 and 200 individuals which have adapted to the harsh environment. They urinate less than domestic horses and can go five days without water. They drink at an artificial water hole at Garub Pan where a blind has been erected to enable tourists to watch the animals without disturbing them.

== History ==
The village's name comes from the Khoekhoe for "big snake." The village was formerly the site of a prisoner-of-war camp established by the South African army in 1915 to house German inmates captured during the First World War. The inmates initially lived in tents but later built brick houses. The number of prisoners reached 1500 but by May 1919 the last inmates left and the camp closed. A plaque marks the site today and some of the houses have been reconstructed. Gold was rumored to have been discovered in the area before then.

In 1970, the population of Aus was 767, of which 197 were white. The town obtained village status in 1925 and municipal status in 1949.

Upon Independence of Namibia Aus was a village, governed by a seven-seat village council. The 1992 Namibian local elections was won by SWAPO which gained 170 votes and four seats, followed by the opposition Democratic Turnhalle Alliance (DTA) which gained 130 votes and three seats. The village status of Aus was revoked before the 1998 local authority elections, so that it came under the governance of the ǁKharas Regional Council.

=== Dutch Reformed Church ===
Afrikaans speakers only began settling around the villages of Aus and Bethanie, both German colonial foundations, in the 1920s. Pastors from the Dutch Reformed Church in South Africa (NGK) were not eager to relocate to what was then South West Africa, only starting the congregations in Otjiwarongo and Gibeon by 1902 and delaying the founding of southern parishes such as Keetmanshoop (1924) and Warmbad (1928). The Keetmanshoop congregation stretched over a vast area that has since spun off into the congregations based in Aus, Bethanie, and Lüderitz - at the time stretching about 650 km (400 mi) west-to-east from Aroab to Lüderitz, including many less easily accessible areas.

The pioneers of the church in southern Namibia were men such as Manie Potgieter (arriving in 1925) and S. Fouche (arriving in 1931). Fouche helped establish the Bethanie congregation (in what is now Lüderitz), but in 1938, the official founding year, M.C. Hattingh became its first formal pastor.

The sheer size of the parish complicated the choice of parsonage. A poorly built rectory in Bethanie was what the pastor had to settle for until a suitable church hall for Bethanie-Aus was built. Parsonages were rented in each town and one bought in Aus later. A proposal to build a hall in Lüderitz was delayed. On September 28, 1940, the Rev. Hattingh moved into a spacious, comfortable hall in Bethanie, built for the cost of £3,500. A hall was rented in Aus and that of the German Evangelical Church was used in Lüderitz. Church council meetings alternated among Aus, Bethanie, and Lüderitz.

Since Aus was a more central location, the pastor moved there and it was separated municipally from Bethanie. This happened during the tenure of Petrus Swart, who transferred to Soutpan after more than six years of service. Dr. P.A.M. Brink from Gansbaai arrived in 1949, at which time the separation of Aus from Bethanie and Lüderitz was completed. He was hired in Lüderitz and served Aus residents from there.

== Gallery ==
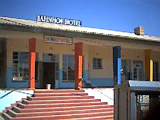
Bahnhof Hotel in Aus

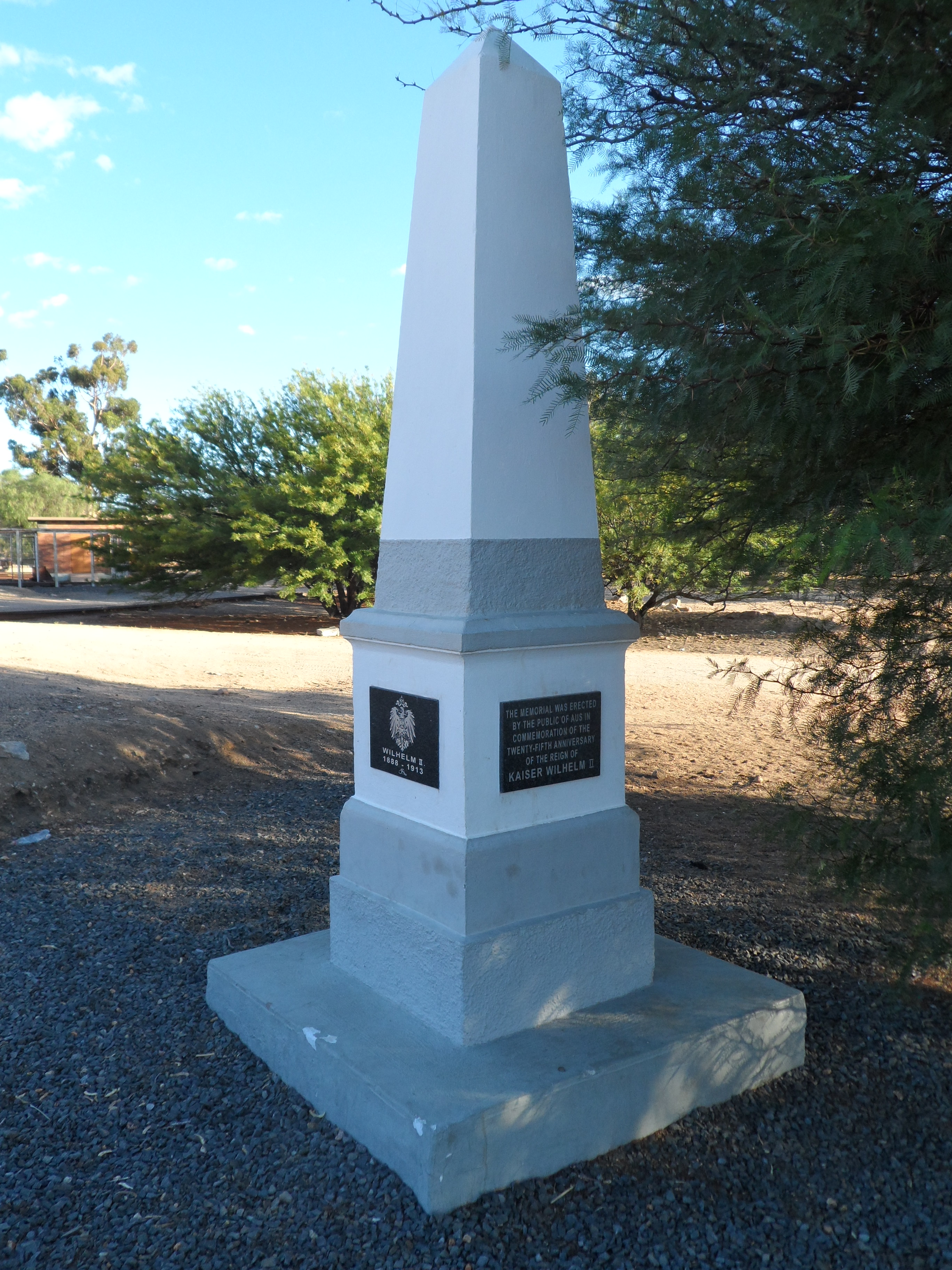
Kaiser Wilhelm II. monument at Aus railway station

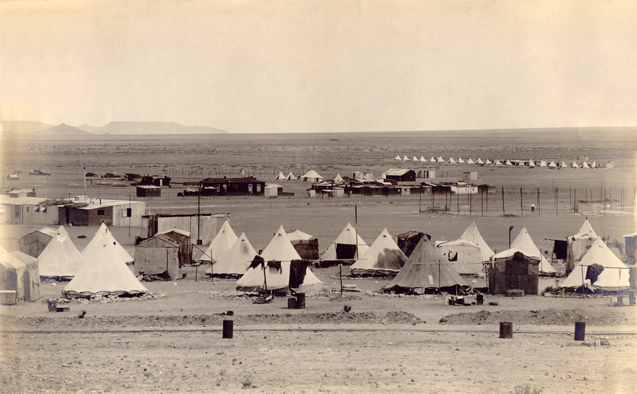
Aus - Camp for German prisoners of war 1915-1919

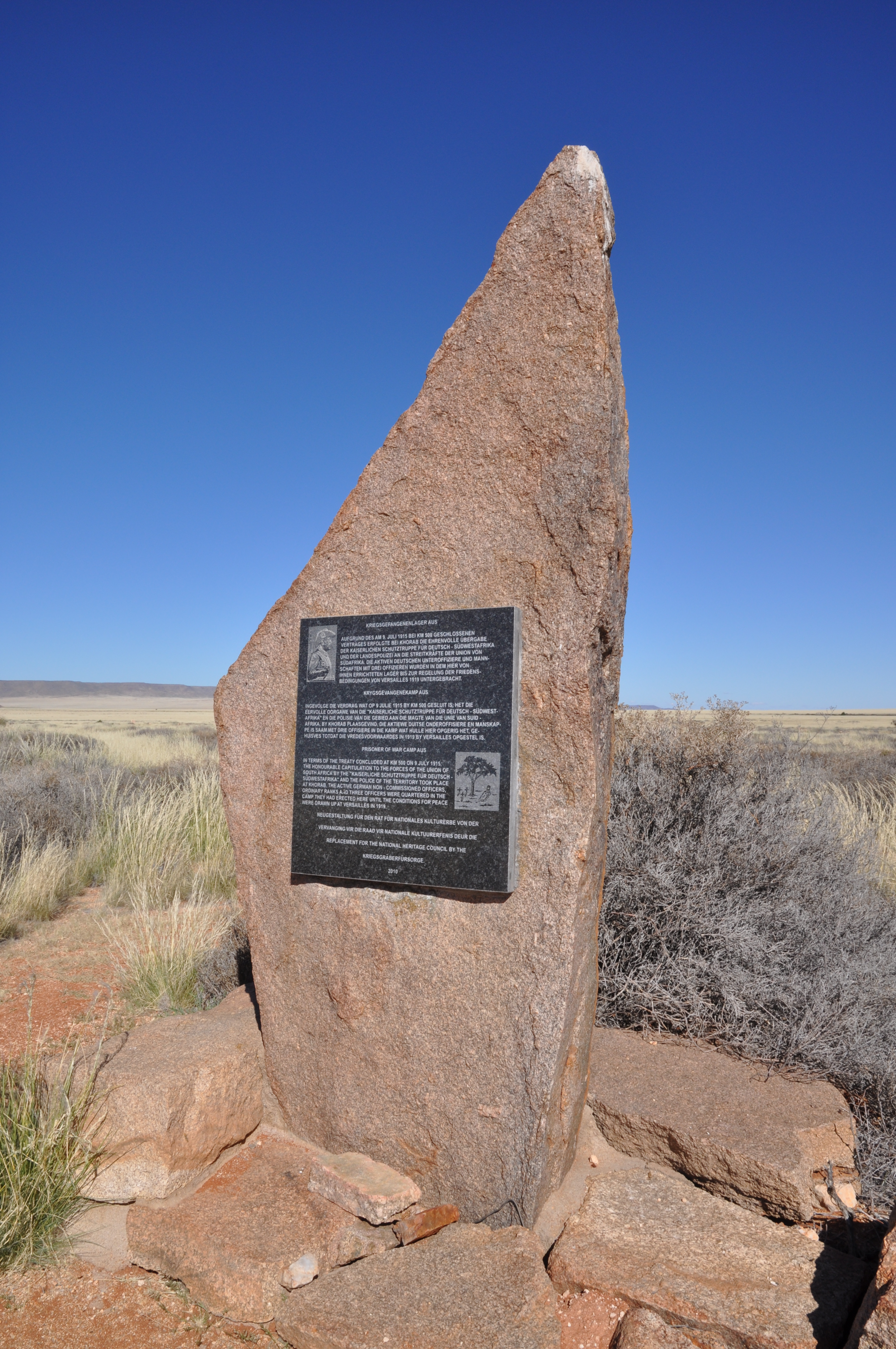
Memorial: Prisoner of War Camp Aus

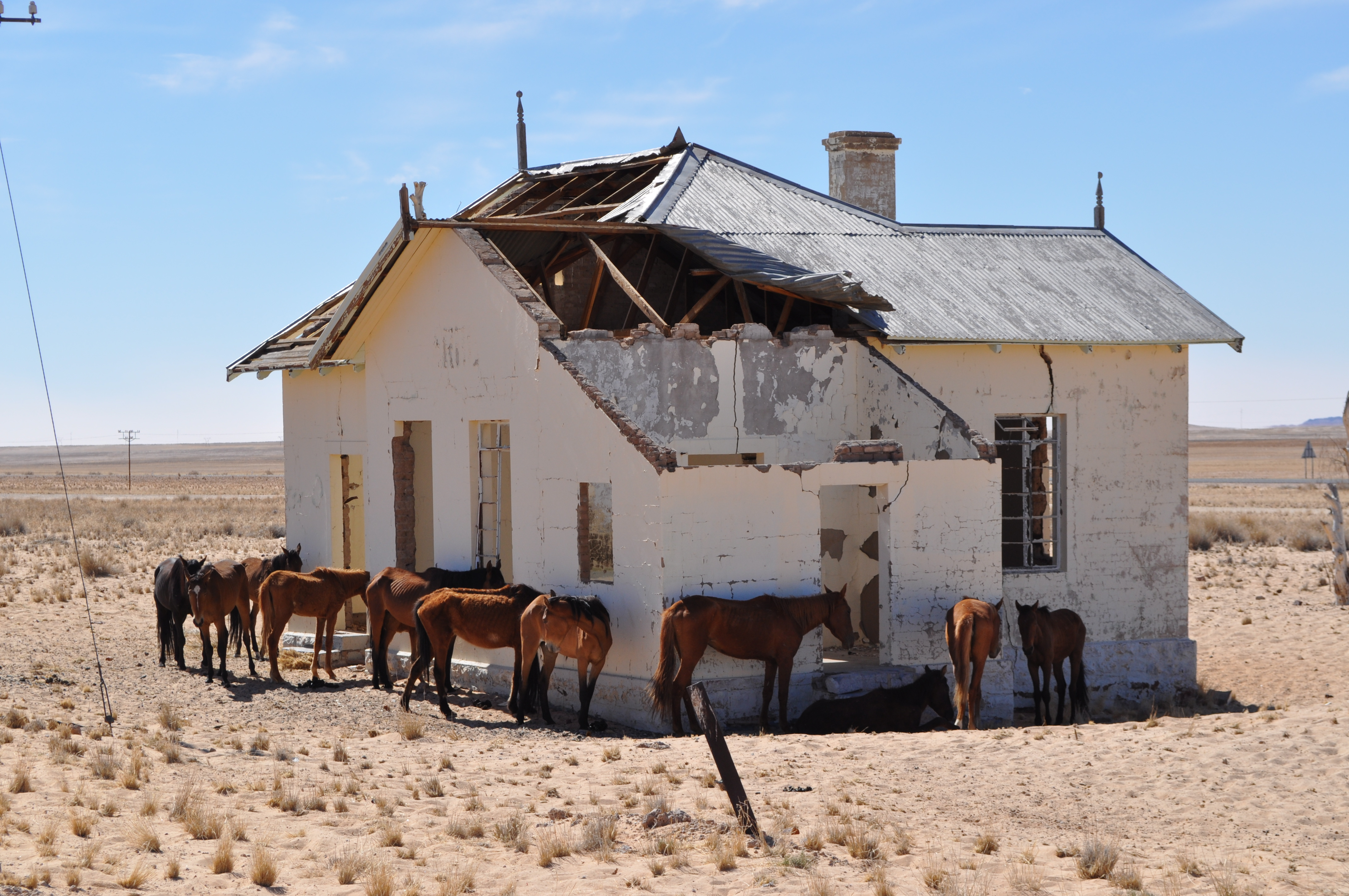
Desert horses at Garub

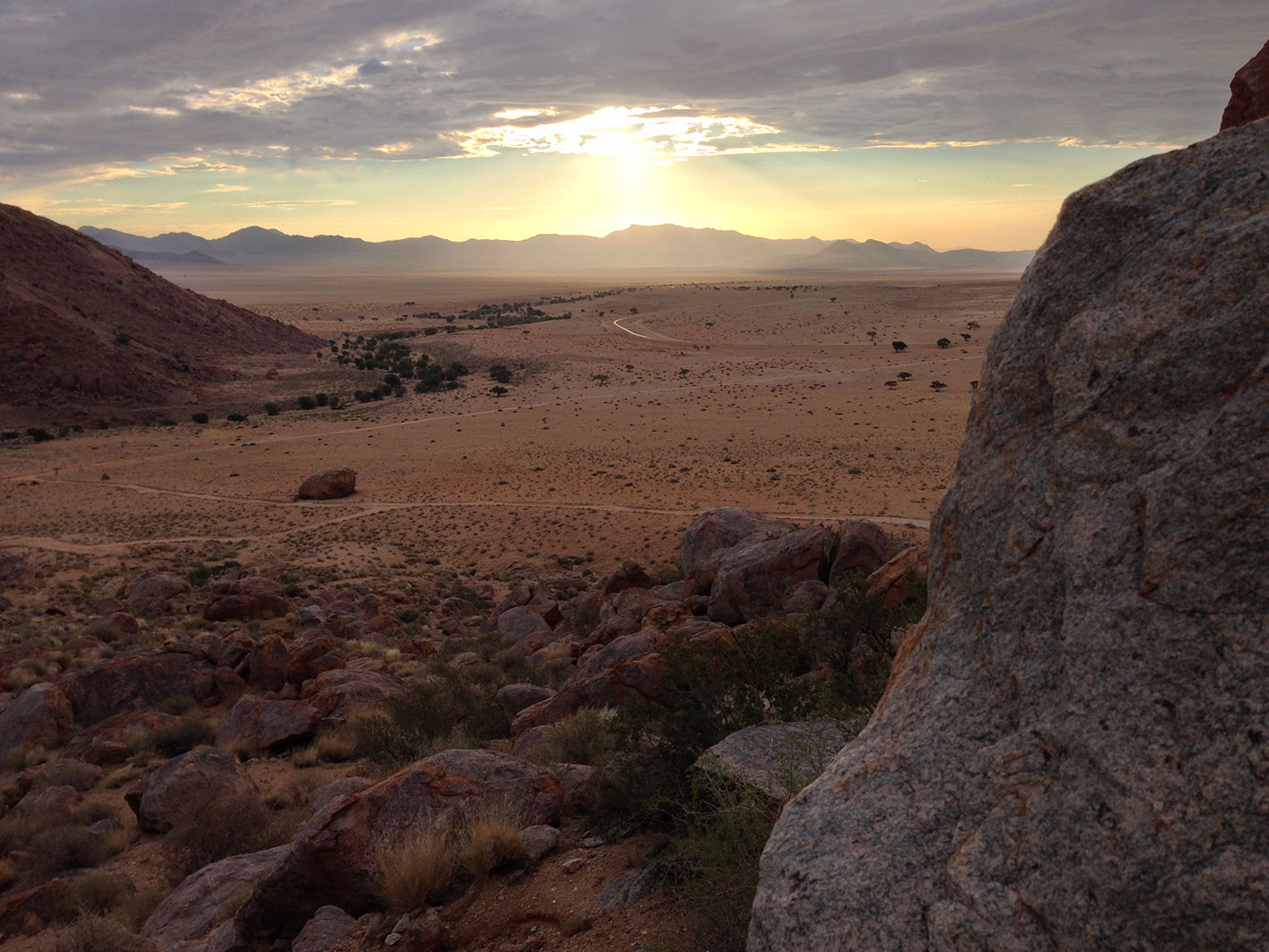
Aus and Tsaukluft mountains

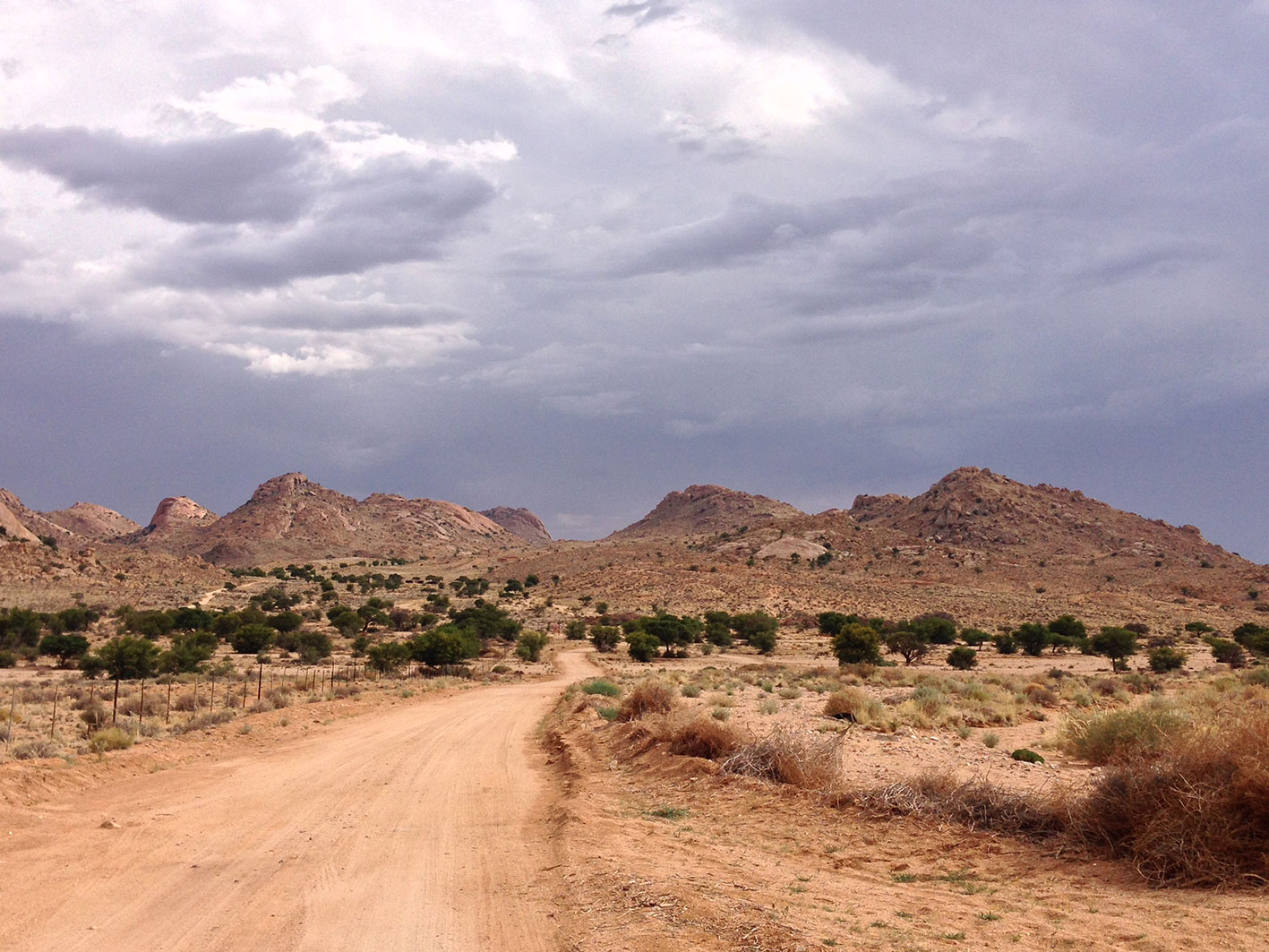
Aus mountains

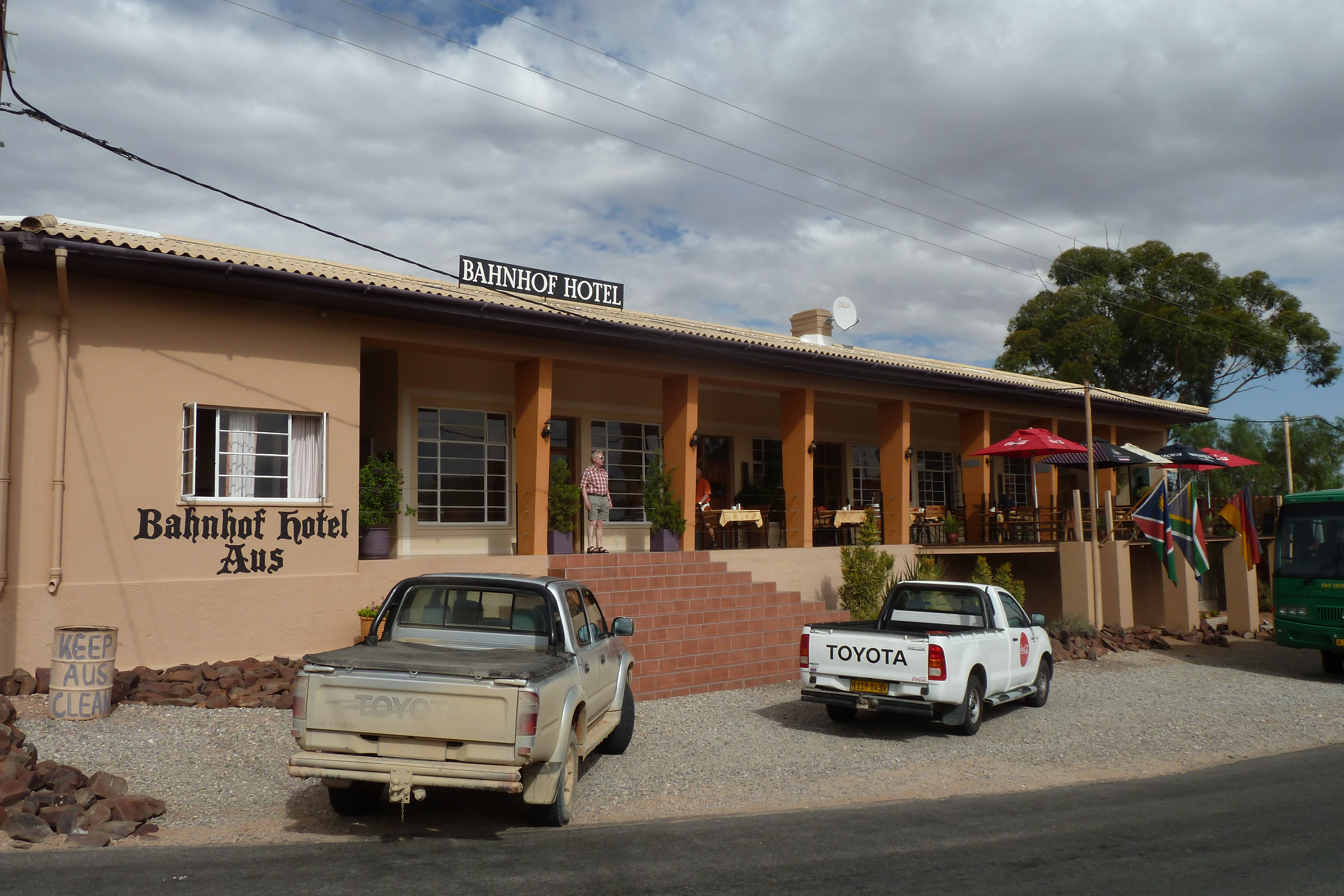

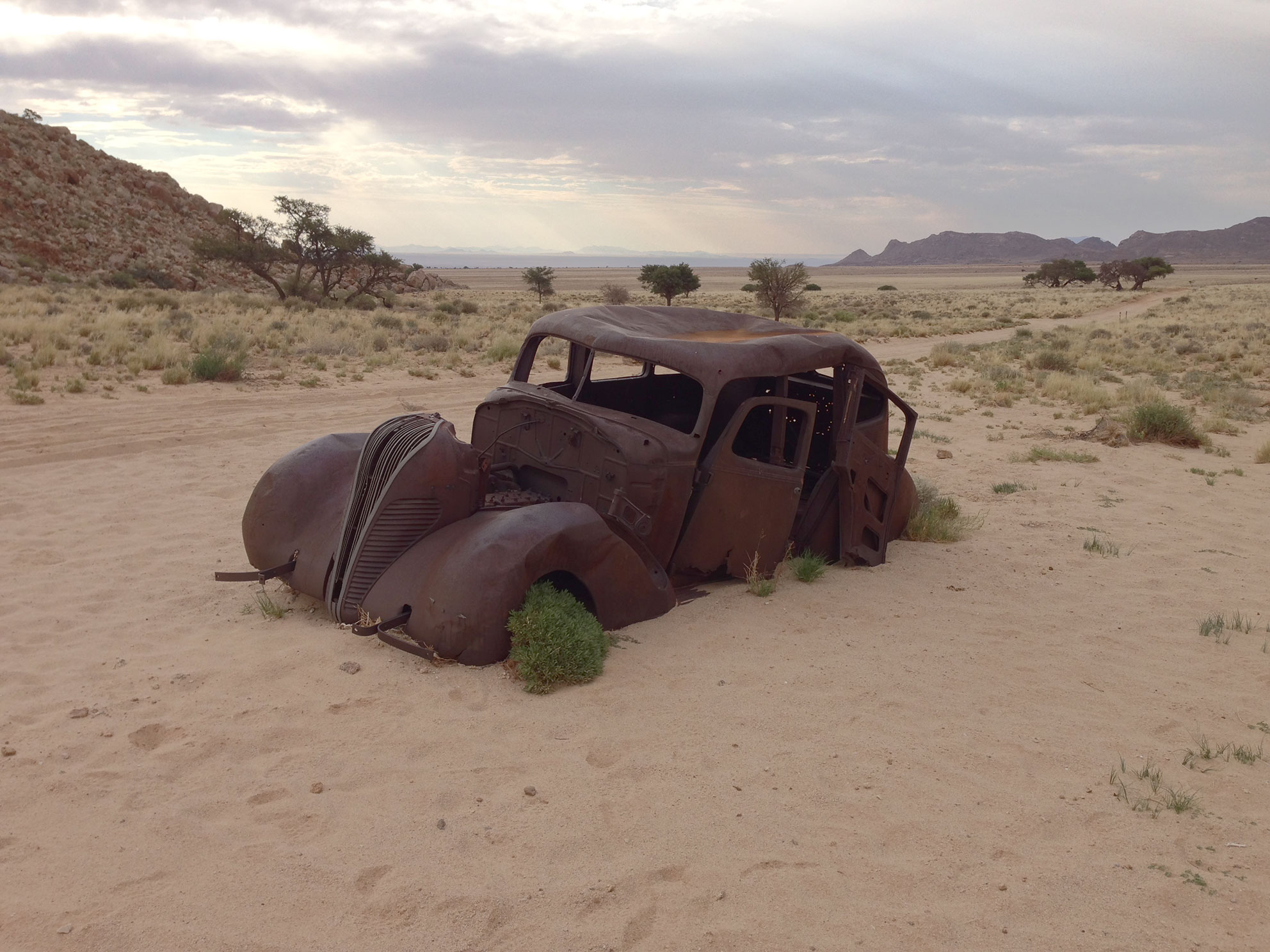
