= Mpungu =

Settlement in Namibia

- Settlement
- Location in Namibia
- Coordinates: 17°40′1.20″S 18°13′58.80″E
- Country: Namibia
- Region: Kavango West
- Constituency: Mpungu Constituency
- Time zone: UTC+2 (South African Standard Time)
- Climate: BSh

Mpungu is a settlement and a former mission station of the Finnish Missionary Society in the Mpungu Constituency in the Kavango West Region in Northern Namibia. It is located ca. 40 km south-west of Nkurenkuru and is inland as opposed to other former Finnish mission stations, which were located along the Kavango River. Today, a tarred highway from Ovamboland to Kavango connects Mpungu to other places in northern Namibia.

== History ==
The mission station was founded in 1951 by Hellin Elomaa, a nurse, who also founded a small clinic there.

In Mpungu, the Finnish missionaries were also in touch with the local San population.

== Infrastructure ==
Today there is still a health centre in Mpungu, as well as the Himarwa Iithete Senior Secondary School. Mpungu is situated on the B15 national road that connects to Angola via the Katwitwi settlement and border post to the north, and to Tsintsabis and Tsumeb to the south. It also connects to Okongo via the C45.
