= B14 road (Namibia) =

Road in Namibia

B14 road

- Map of the B14.

Route information
- Maintained by Roads Authority Namibia
- Length: 389 km (242 mi) Not including the planned extension from Gobabis to Aranos.

Major junctions
- South end: B6 near Gobabis
- North end: B8 in Grootfontein

Location
- Country: Namibia

Highway system
- Transport in Namibia
← B11	→ B15

The B14 is a national road in Namibia, running since 2018 from Gobabis to Grootfontein. A further expansion from Gobabis to Aranos in the south is planned.
