= B1 road (Namibia) =

National highway of Namibia

B1 road

- Map of the B1.

Route information
- Maintained by Roads Authority Namibia
- Length: 1,467 km (912 mi) Excluding the 74-kilometre (46 mi) central section designated A1 since 2017.

Southern section
- Length: 802 km (498 mi)
- South end: N7 at the South African border at Noordoewer
- Major intersections: B3 at Grünau; B4 near Keetmanshoop
- North end: A1 / B6 in Windhoek

Northern section
- Length: 665 km (413 mi)
- South end: A1 / B2 near Okahandja
- Major intersections: B8 at Otavi; B15 at Tsumeb; B10 near Oshikango
- North end: EN 120 at the Angolan border at Oshikango

Location
- Country: Namibia
- Major cities: Keetmanshoop; Mariental; Rehoboth; Windhoek; Okahandja; Otjiwarongo; Otavi; Tsumeb; Ondangwa; Oshakati
- Towns: Grünau; Hardap; Oshivelo; Omuthiya; Endola; Oshikango

Highway system
- Transport in Namibia
← A1	→ B2

The B1 is a national highway of Namibia, and is the country's longest and most significant road, running the length of the country from south to north. It connects Noordoewer in the south on the South African border with Oshikango in the north on the Angolan border via Namibia's capital city Windhoek.

The route exists in two discontinuous sections: a southern 802-kilometre (498 mi) section from Noordoewer to Windhoek, and a northern 665-kilometre (413 mi) section from Okahandja to Oshikango. The central 74-kilometre (46 mi) section between Windhoek and Okahandja, previously part of the B1, was upgraded to freeway standard beginning in the 1970s and continuing to 2022, with the freeway sections now carrying the designation of A1.

The entirety of the B1, together with the former section of B1 now designated A1, forms part of the Tripoli-Cape Town Highway. The section between Okahandja and Otavi is part of the Walvis Bay-Ndola-Lubumbashi Development Road, and the former section of B1 now designated A1 from Okahandja to Windhoek forms part of the Trans-Kalahari Corridor.

== Route ==
Important cities that the B1 passes through in a north–south direction include Oshikango, Ondangwa, Tsumeb, Otavi, Otjiwarongo, Okahandja, Windhoek, Rehoboth, Mariental, Keetmanshoop and Noordoewer.

=== Southern section: Noordoewer to Windhoek ===
The B1 begins on the South African border at a bridge over the Orange River near the town of Noordoewer, as a continuation of South Africa's N7 national route. It heads north to Grünau, where it meets the B3 from Karasburg (and Upington from continuing on South Africa's N10 national route) and the Nakop-Windhoek railway line. From there, it continues north to the city of Keetmanshoop; on the southern outskirts, it intersects by means of a traffic circle with the B4 to Lüderitz.

From Keetmanshoop, the route continues north along the western fringes of the Kalahari Desert, passing through Mariental, Kalkrand and Rehoboth. The route then passes through a mountainous region and emerges in the southern suburbs of Namibia's capital city Windhoek near Eros Airport.

=== Central section: Windhoek to Okahandja ===
Most of the 74-kilometre (46 mi) section between Windhoek and Okahandja has been upgraded to freeway standard (beginning with a western bypass of Windhoek built in the 1970s), and since April 2017, the freeway sections have been redesignated by the Roads Authority Namibia as the A1. Remaining sections of the B1 just south of Okahandja are expected to be upgraded to freeway standard by 2022. At Okahandja, it meets the B2, which connects to Walvis Bay.

=== Northern section: Okahandja to Oshikango ===
From Okahandja, the B1 resumes and heads north for approximately 175 kilometres (109 mi) to Otjiwarongo; this section is considered one of the deadliest roads in Namibia with a high crash fatality rate. From Otjiwarongo, the B1 heads in a more north-easterly direction to avoid the Etosha National Park, passing through Otavi (where the B8 provides a route to the Caprivi Strip and the border with Zambia) before reaching Tsumeb.

At Tsumeb, the route makes a hard turn to the north-west at the intersection with the B15 and skirts the Etosha Pan to reach Oshivelo and thence Ondangwa, from where it resumes a northerly path and heads to Oshikango. At Oshikango, the route crosses the border into Angola and becomes the EN 120.

== History ==
The northern stretch of the road from Tsumeb to Ondangwa via Namutoni was built in 1957–58. Ca. a decade later it was paved, but now it went through Oshivelo, and the paved section went from Ondangwa to Oshakati. The stretch from Ondangwa to Oshikango was still a gravel road.

In 2007 the B1 lent its name to the B1 Butcher, a serial killer who professionally dismembered his victims and deposited body parts of at least five women near the road. The murderer has never been identified.

== Gallery ==
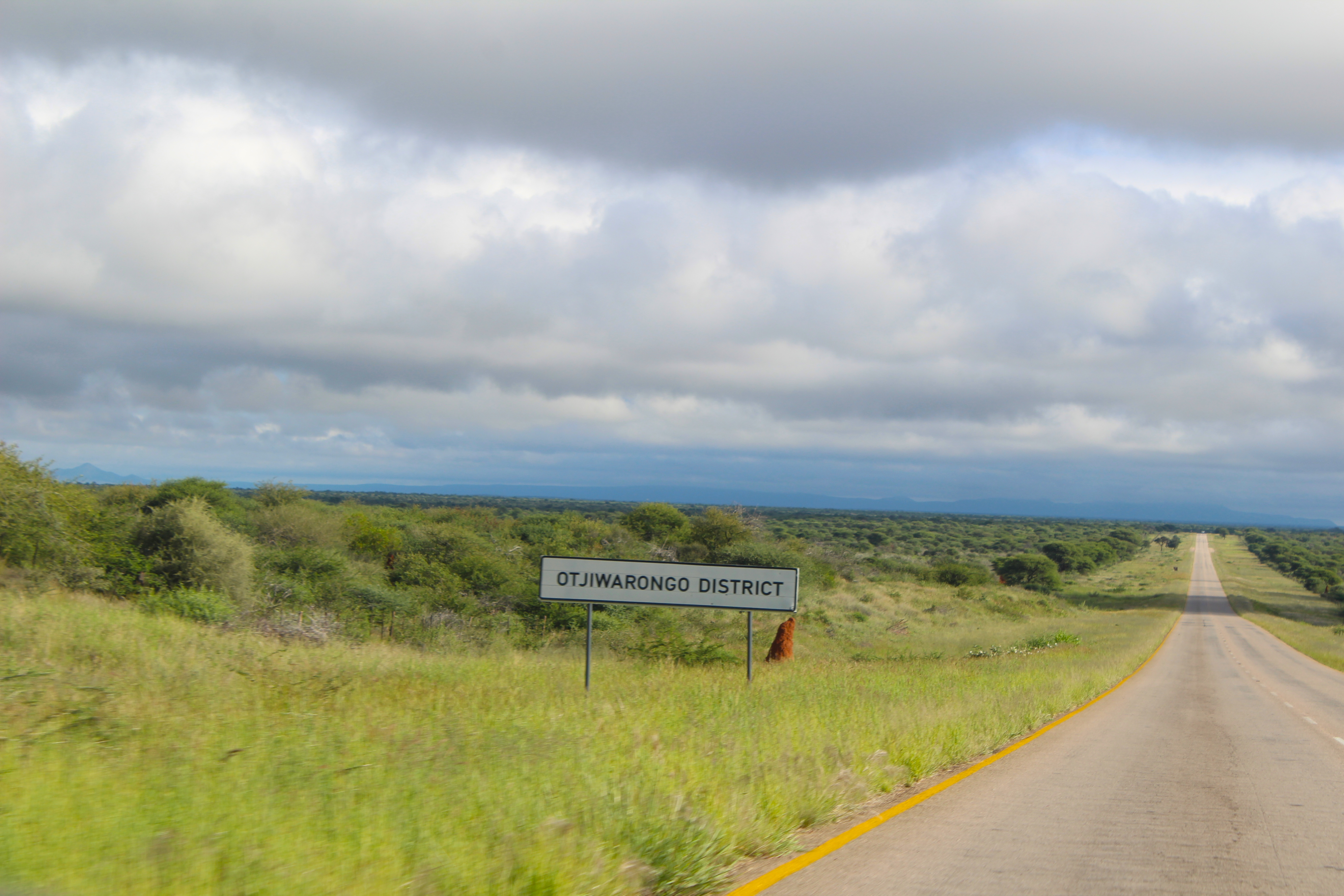

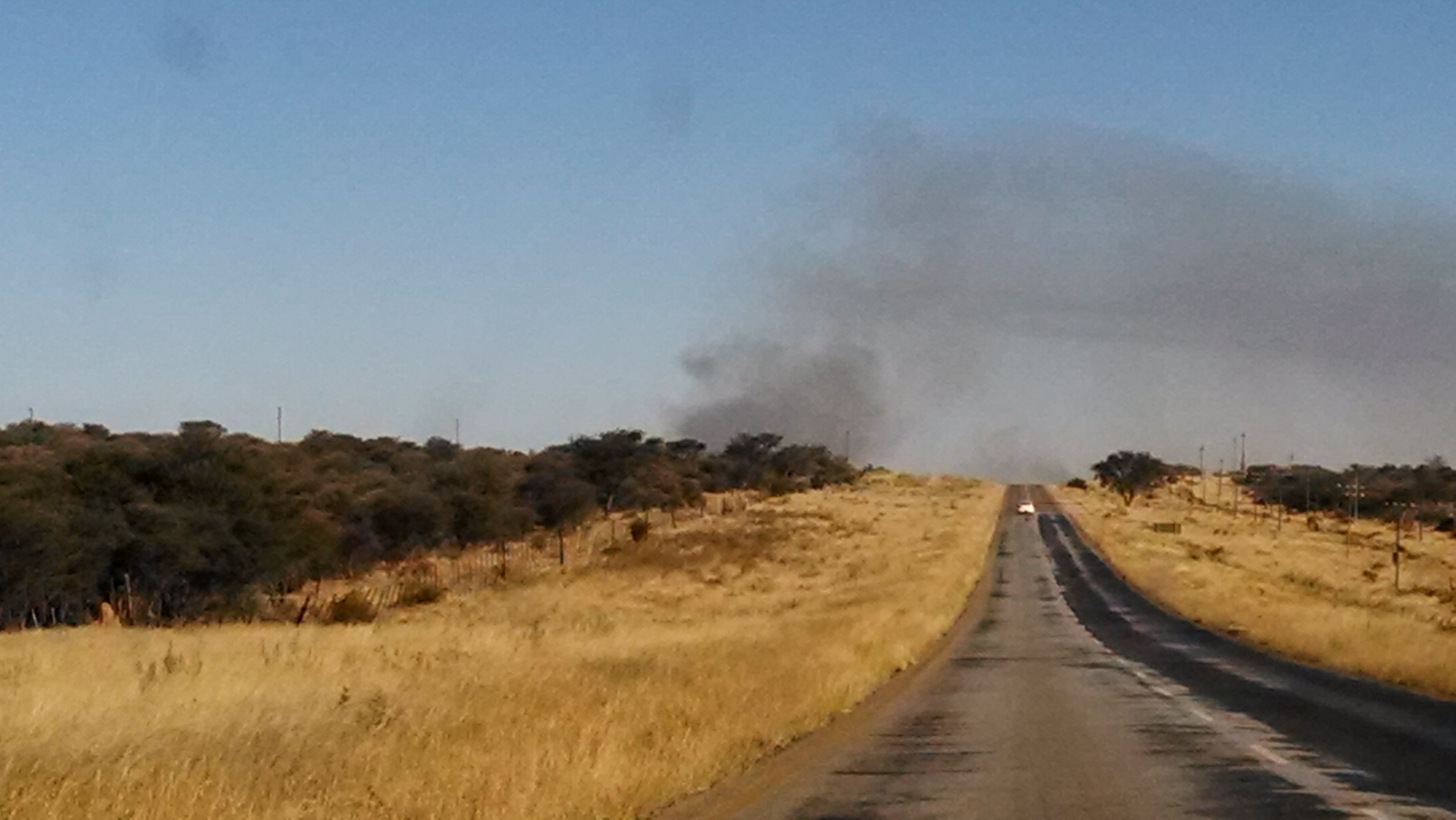

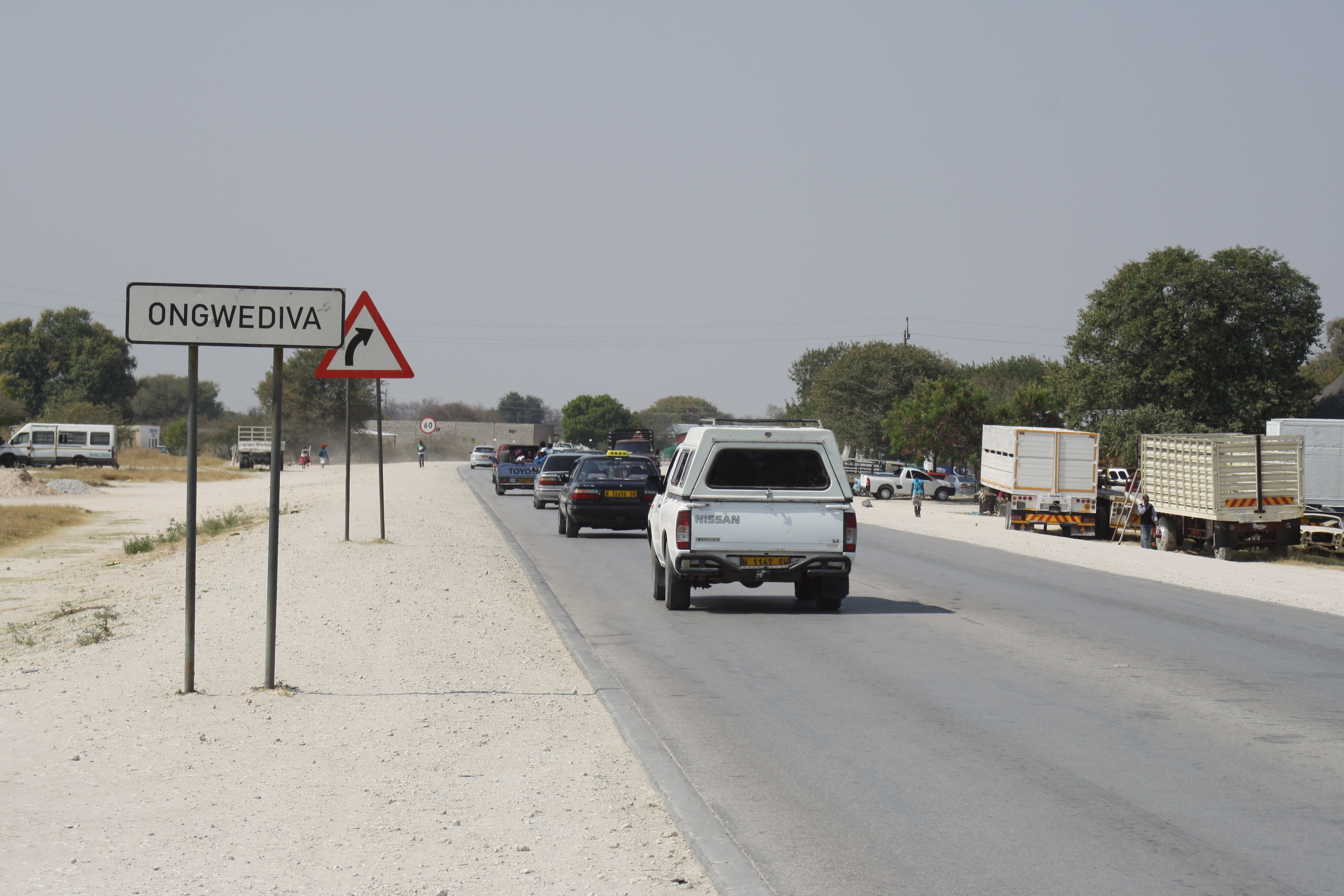

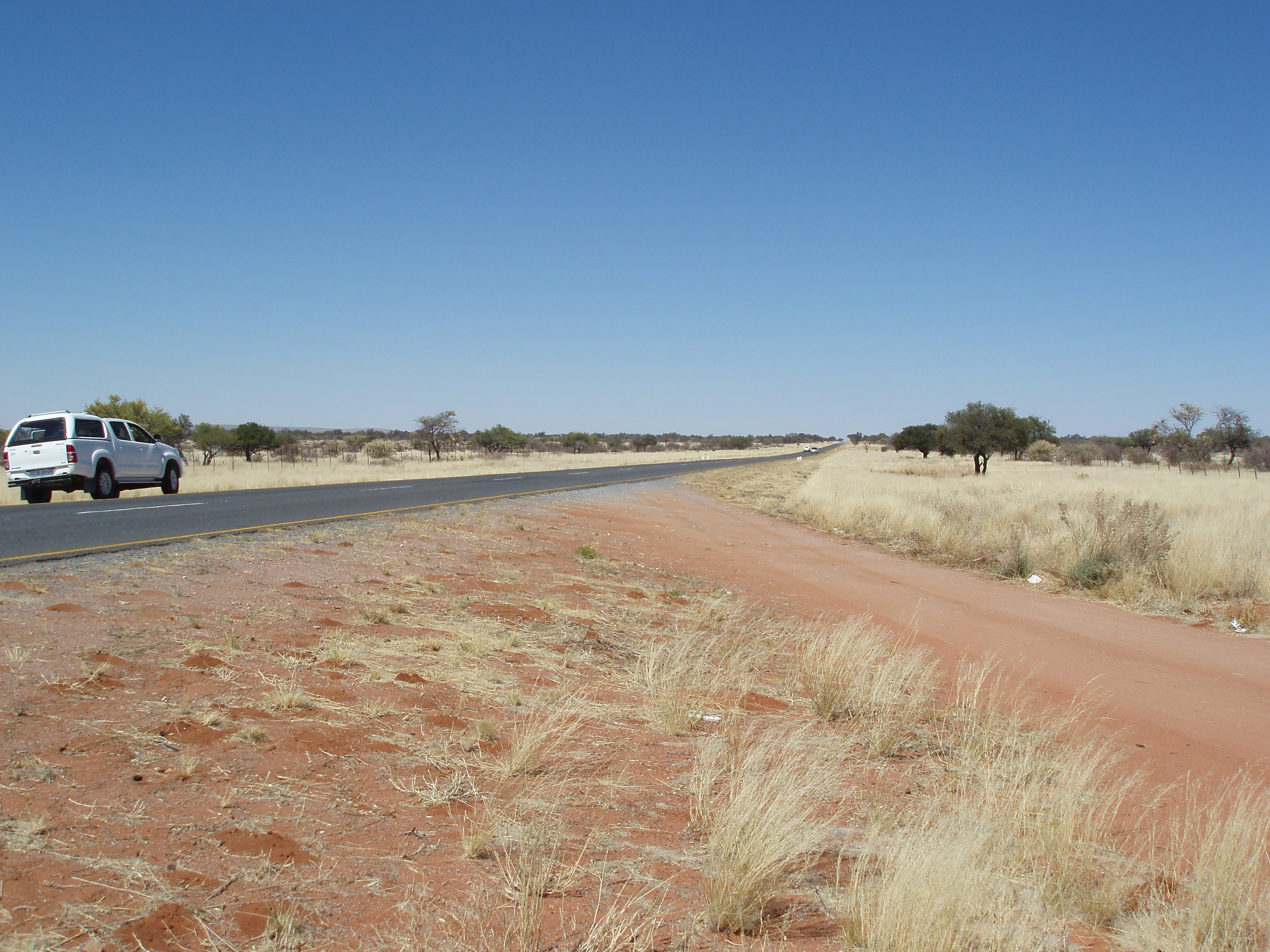

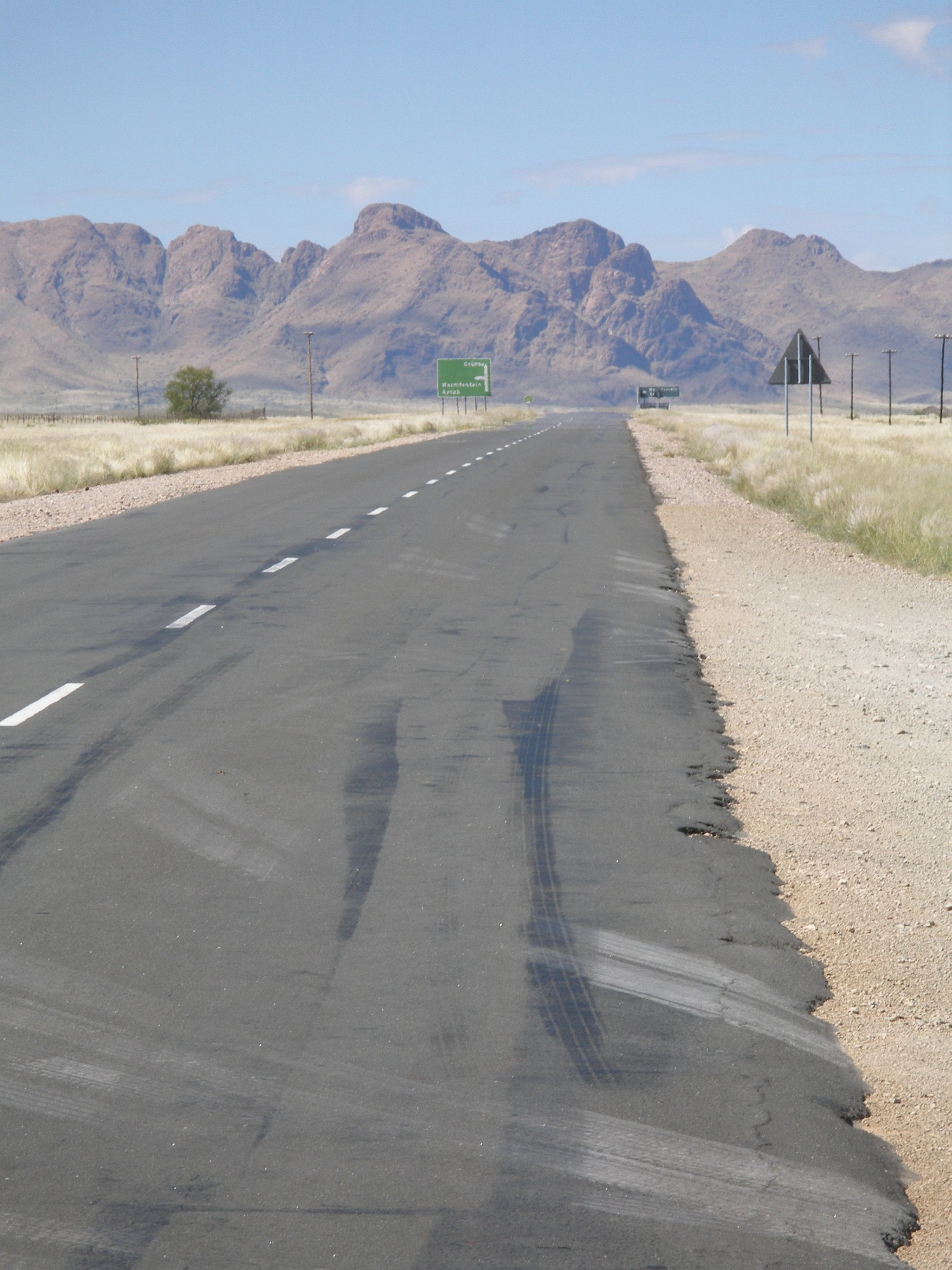

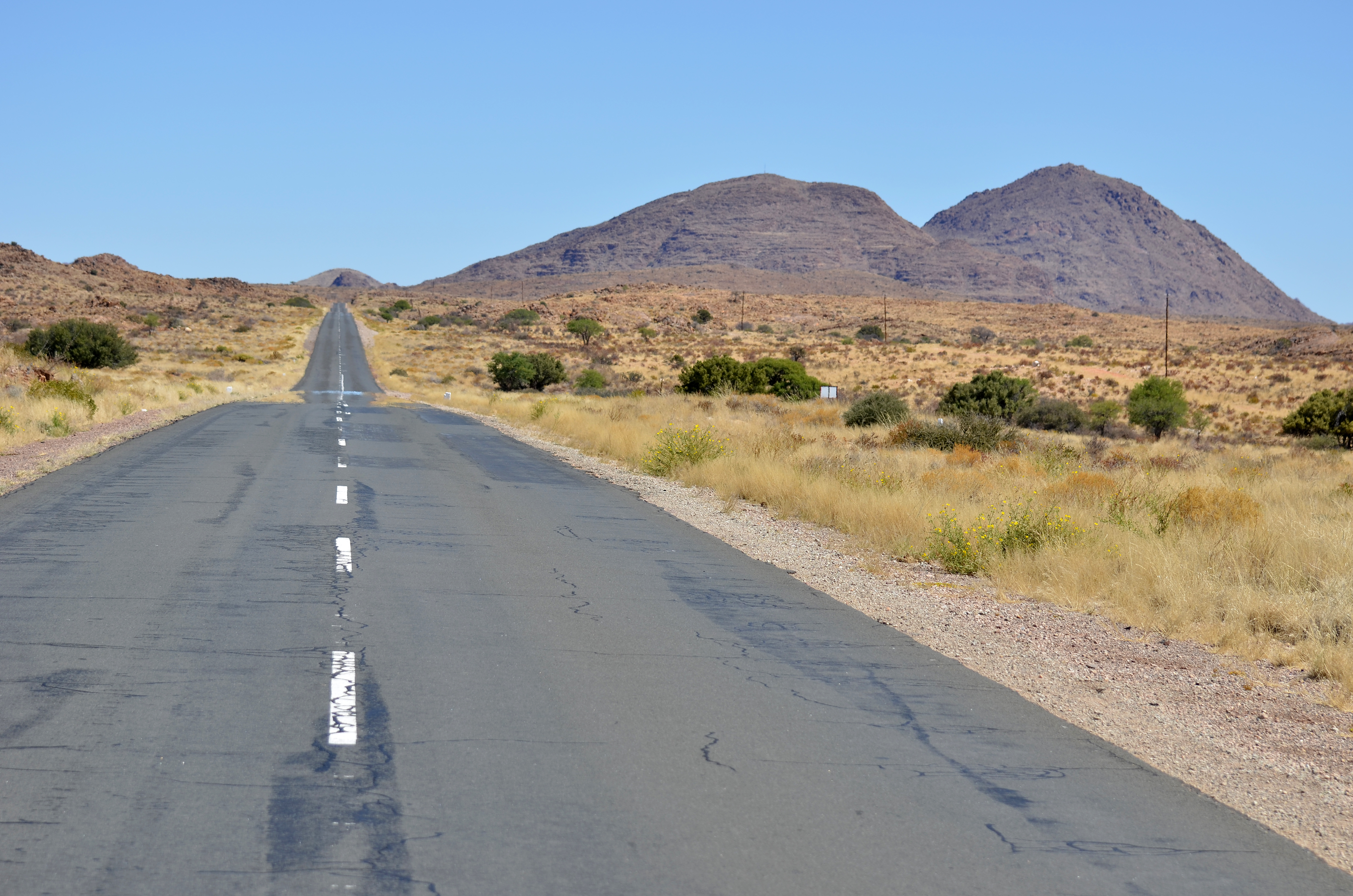

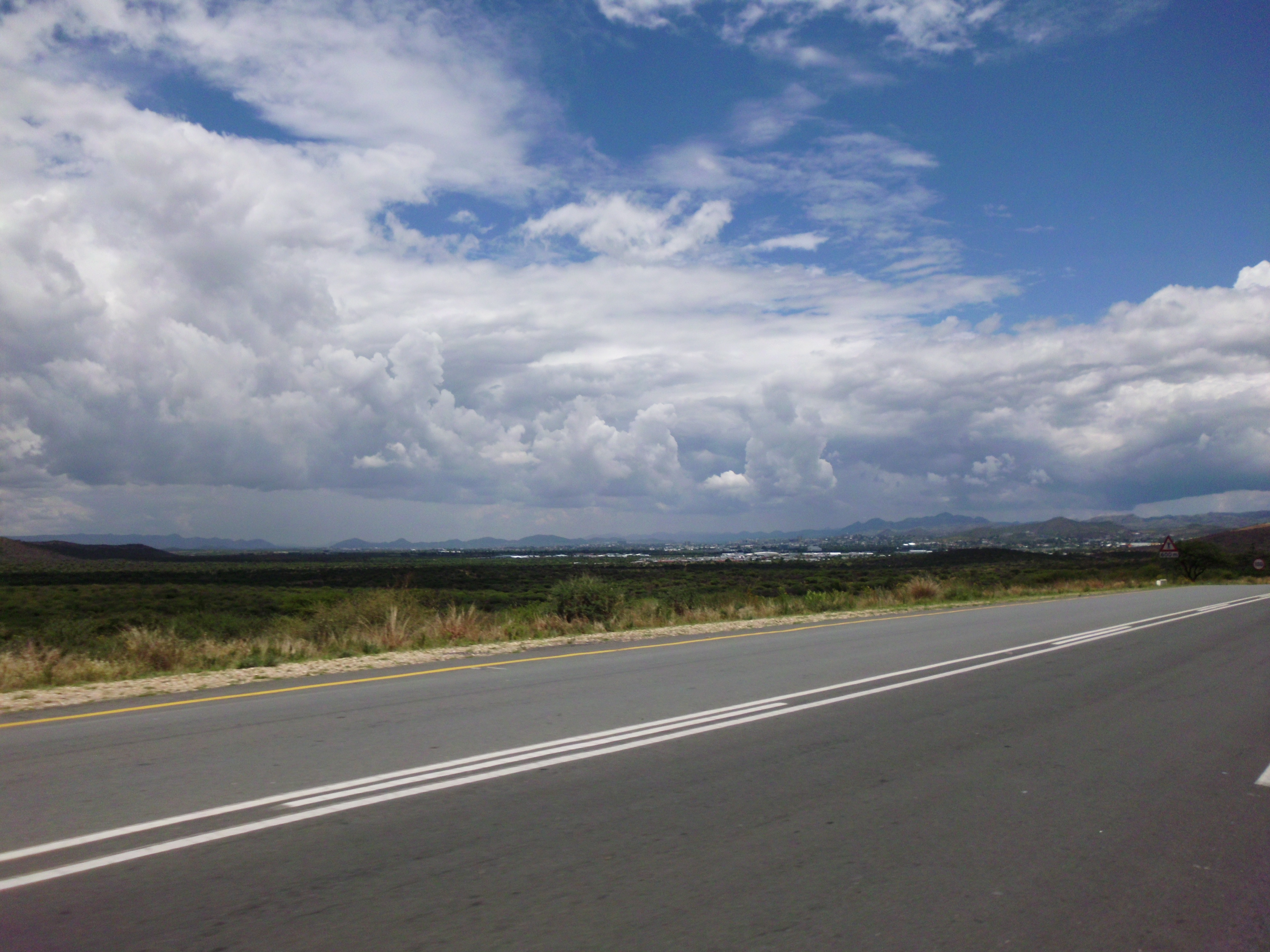

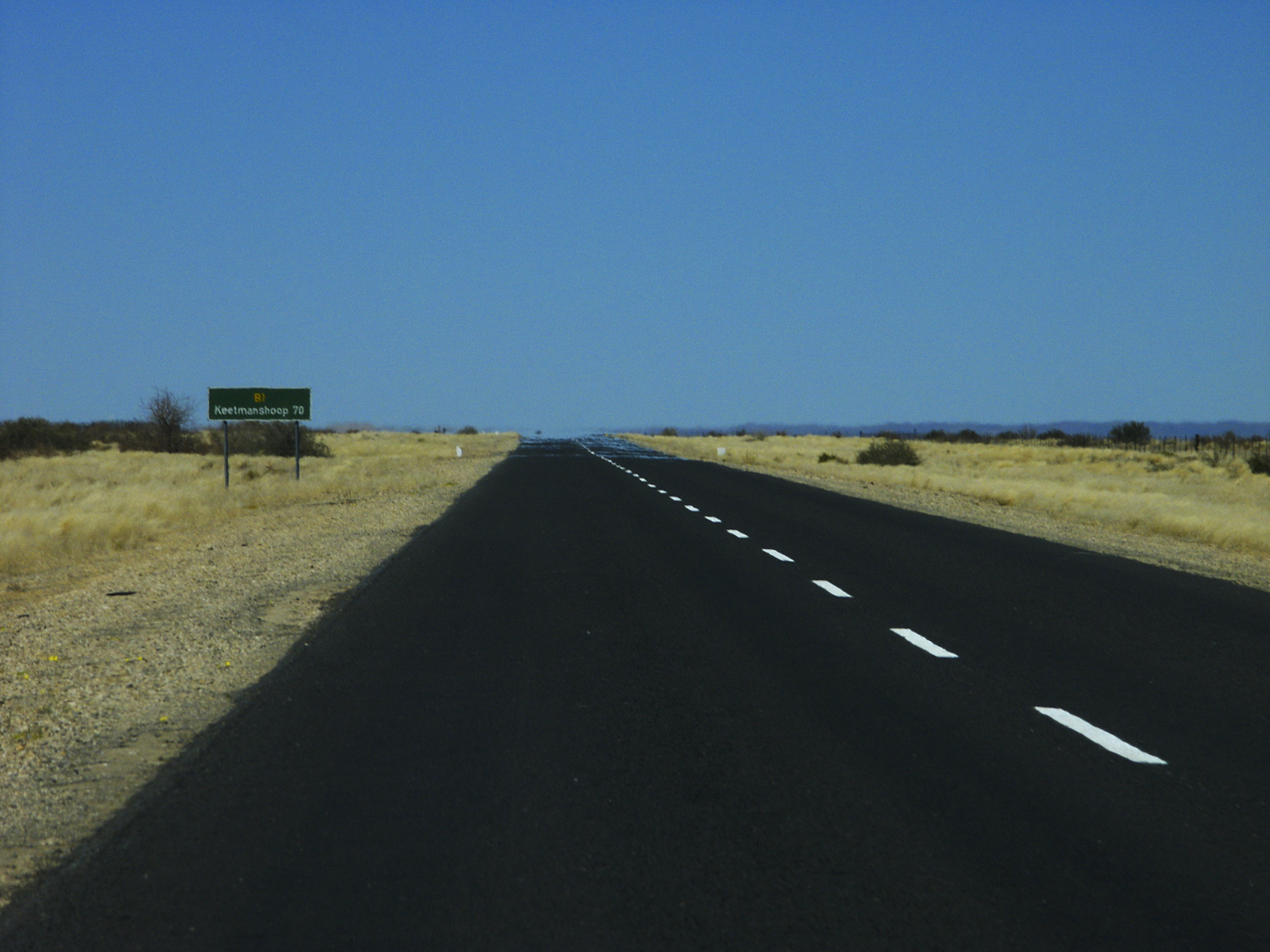

== See also ==
- Transport in Namibia
