= Mile 30 =

- Settlement
- Location in Namibia
- Coordinates: 18.198°S 19.481°E
- Country: Namibia
- Region: Kavango East
- Time zone: UTC+2 (South African Standard Time)

Mile 30 is a settlement that is situated 30 miles (48 km) south of Rundu in the Kavango East region of Namibia, on the B8 national road. It contains a school, a chapel of the Evangelical Lutheran Church in Namibia (ELCIN), some shops and a clinic.

The people of this village mainly depend on subsistence farming. The soil in this area is very fertile. People in this area have started to develop a community conservancy aimed at protecting the wildlife.

The majority of the males in this area carve wood crafts, which they sell to tourists in Okahandja.
