= B4 road (Namibia) =

National highway of Namibia

B4 road

- Map of the B4.

Route information
- Maintained by Roads Authority Namibia
- Length: 334 km (208 mi)

Major junctions
- East end: B1 near Keetmanshoop
- West end: Lüderitz

Location
- Country: Namibia
- Major cities: Keetmanshoop, Aus, Lüderitz
- Towns: Seeheim, Goageb, Garub, Kolmanskop

Highway system
- Transport in Namibia
← B3	→ B6

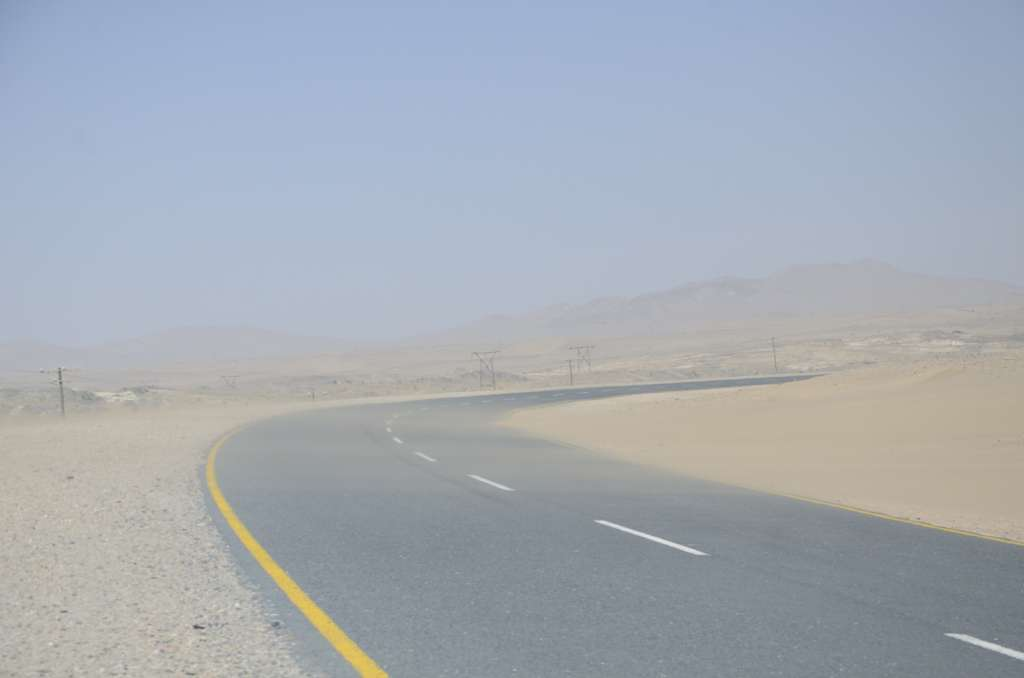
B4 road

B4 is a national highway of Namibia. It passes through the ǁKaras Region of Namibia in the south-west in a west–east direction for 334 kilometres (208 mi), connecting Lüderitz on the coast to Keetmanshoop.

The B4 crosses the Sperrgebiet, an area restricted for diamond mining along the coast of the Atlantic, between Aus and Lüderitz. Travellers may leave the road only at demarcated places. It also forms the southern border of the Namib-Naukluft National Park.
