= B8 road (Namibia) =

National highway of Namibia

B8 road

- Map of the B8.

Route information
- Maintained by Roads Authority Namibia
- Length: 933 km (580 mi) Includes the main route between Otavi and Ngoma, and a short 4 km (2.5 mi) spur section also designated B8 between Katima Mulilo and the Katima Mulilo Bridge.

Main route
- Length: 929 km (577 mi)
- West end: B1 in Otavi
- Major intersections: B14 in Grootfontein; B10 in Rundu; B8 (Katima Mulilo spur) in Katima Mulilo
- East end: A33 A33 at the Botswanan border at Ngoma

Katima Mulilo spur
- Length: 4 km (2.5 mi)
- South end: B8 (main route) in Katima Mulilo
- North end: M10 at the Zambian border (Wenela Border Post) near the Katima Mulilo Bridge

Location
- Country: Namibia
- Major cities: Otavi, Grootfontein, Rundu, Divundu, Katima Mulilo

Highway system
- Transport in Namibia
← B6	→ B10

B8 road often known as the Golden Highway is one of the national highways of Namibia. It leads from the B1 at Otavi via Grootfontein and Rundu through the Caprivi Strip to the border town of Katima Mulilo (where there is a short 4-kilometre (2.5 mi) spur section, also designated B8, crossing into Zambia) and further on to the Botswana border at Ngoma. The section from Otavi to Katima Mulilo forms part of the Walvis Bay-Ndola-Lubumbashi Development Road (Trans-Caprivi Highway).

== Populated places ==
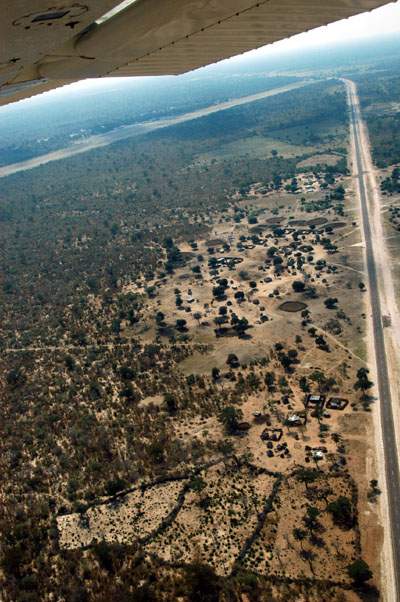
Crossing the Trans–Caprivi Highway on approach to Katima's Mpacha Airport.

from west to east

- Otavi
- Kombat
- Grootfontein
- Mile 30, 30 miles (48 km) south of Rundu
- Rundu
- Ndiyona
- Divundu
- Kongola
- Katima Mulilo
- Ngoma
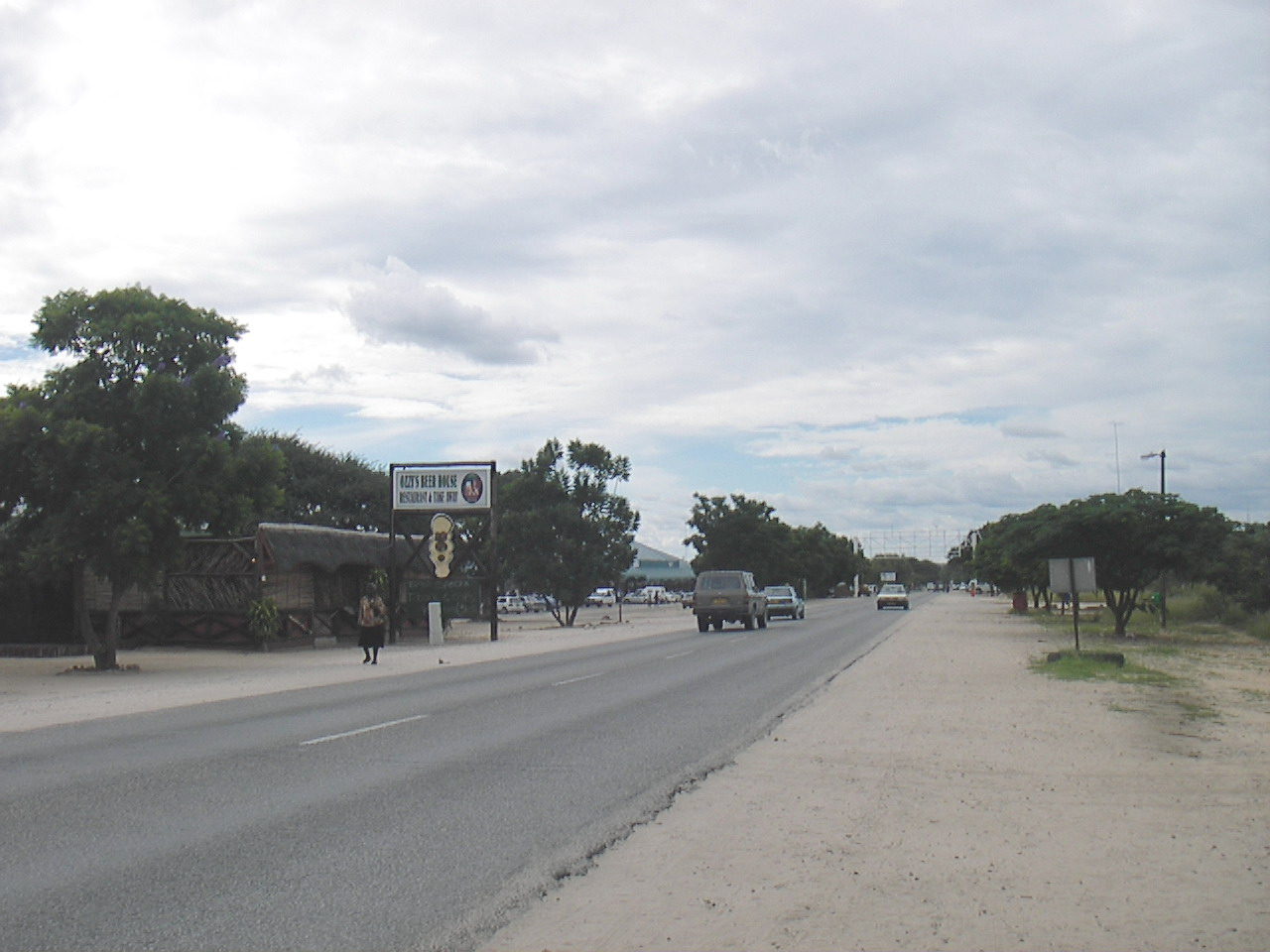
  Eugen Kakukuru Street in Rundu, Namibia, which leads onto National Road B8.

== See also ==
- Trans-Caprivi Highway
- Trans-African Highway network
