= Elisenheim =

Suburb of Windhoek, Namibia

Elisenheim is a residential area north of Windhoek, the capital of Namibia. It was declared a township in December 2011 when the first housing plans were submitted to the City of Windhoek. Since then, infrastructure such as roads, sewerage, and electricity installations has been put in place.

The development of Elisenheim was estimated to cost over a billion Namibian dollars, making it the largest residential project in Namibia.
