= Oshikango =

- Village
- Location in Namibia
- Coordinates: 17°24′S 15°53′E
- Country: Namibia
- Region: Ohangwena Region
- Region: Oshikango Constituency
- Elevation: 3,606 ft (1,099 m)
- Time zone: UTC+1 (South African Standard Time)

Oshikango is a former village in northern Namibia and since 2004 part of the town of Helao Nafidi, although it still maintained its own village council for a number of years. Oshikango is still the name of the border post with Angola and the electoral constituency for this suburb. It is estimated to have grown from "a tiny cluster of shebeens around an open market into a thriving boomtown with around 5,000 to 8,000 inhabitants over a period of 10 years".

== History ==
The Oshikango area was heavily affected by the 1966 to 1989 South African Border War between South Africa and its allied forces (mainly UNITA) and the Angolan government and the South West Africa People's Organisation (SWAPO). The war ended with South Africa agreeing to Namibian independence. In 1996 Oshikango, along with many other settlements in the area, was proclaimed a village with the aim of increasing border trade.

== Economy ==
The border post between Namibia and Angola has brought business opportunities to Oshikango and the surrounding area. With the help of the European Union an Export Processing Zone consisting of 14 warehouses was established there. The nearby village of Omafo, now a suburb of Helao Nafidi, hosts an annual trade show.

The parallel prevalence of land owned by the village of Oshikango, the town of Helao Nafidi, and land under traditional jurisdiction has led to uncertainties about ownership that had to be settled in court.

There are some manufacturing companies in Oshikango, for example Fatima Plastic which donated Engela hospital the cost of building a bridge after a flood. Chicco, a building material wholesaler, has also set up shop in Oshikango, and there are also large retailers like Pick n Pay and Fysal Fresh Produce. Most villagers however, still mainly survive by agriculture and face the risk of periodic drought.

=== Transport ===
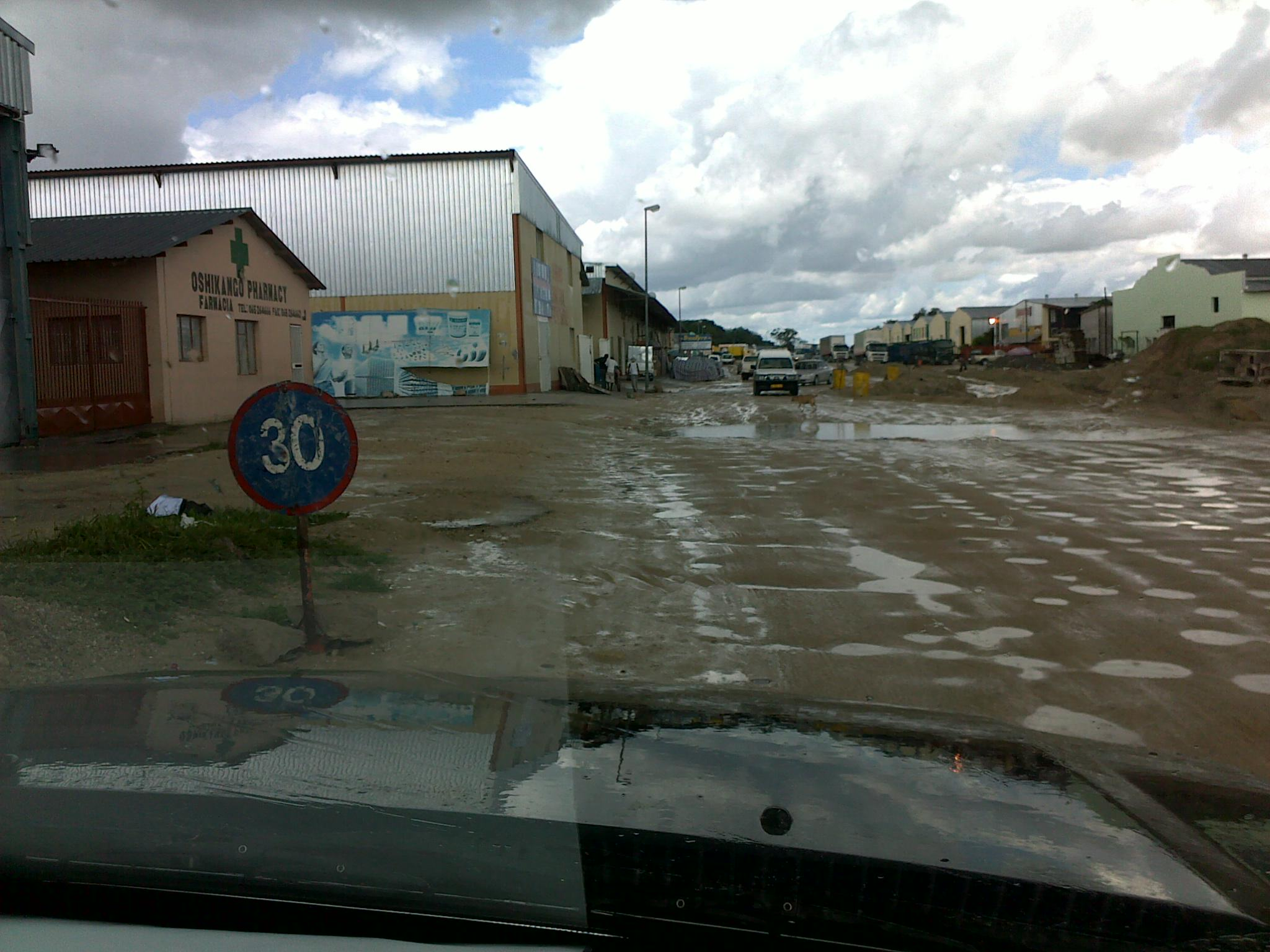
Street in Oshikango

Oshikango is situated on the B1 national road, which continues in Angola as the EN 120. The Oshikango–Santa Clara border post is in town.

In mid-2005, the second stage of the new Northern Railway between Oshikango and Oshivelo began construction. By mid-2006, it had reached Ondangwa. It was inaugurated in 2012. A train service known as the Omugulugwombashe Star traveled weekly on this track until the locomotives broke down after a few rounds of service. In 2024, the last cargo train used the line. In 2008, a short extension across the border was proposed to bypass the congested border post. The next station to the south is Ohangwena.

== Life ==
Oshikango is considered the business hub of the North in Namibia. Many foreign as well as local investors have chosen Oshikango as their stepping-stone for exports into Angola. A governing body dubbed the Oshikango Business Association, in conjunction with Local Government as well as the NCCI (Namibia Chamber of Commerce and Industry) regulate all business related matters in the area.
