= Bill C-48 =

Bill C-48 is a designation given to multiple bills under consideration by the Parliament of Canada. Notable bills with this designation include:

- Bill C-48 (2005), an amendment to the 2005 Canadian federal budget
- Bill C-48 (2019), the Oil Tanker Moratorium Act
