= B6 road (Namibia) =

Road in Namibia

B6 road

- Map of the B6.

Route information
- Maintained by Roads Authority Namibia
- Length: 318 km (198 mi)

Major junctions
- West end: A1 / B1 in Windhoek
- Hosea Kutako International Airport; B14 near Gobabis
- East end: A2 at the Botswanan border at Buitepos

Location
- Country: Namibia
- Towns: Windhoek, Gobabis

Highway system
- Transport in Namibia
← B4	→ B8

B6 is a national highway of eastern-central Namibia. It is 318 kilometres (198 mi) long and connects the capital Windhoek with the Buitepos border crossing to Botswana. Gobabis, the capital of Omaheke Region, lies on the B6, as do the villages of Seeis, Omitara and Witvlei. Hosea Kutako International Airport is also located on the B6, east of Windhoek.

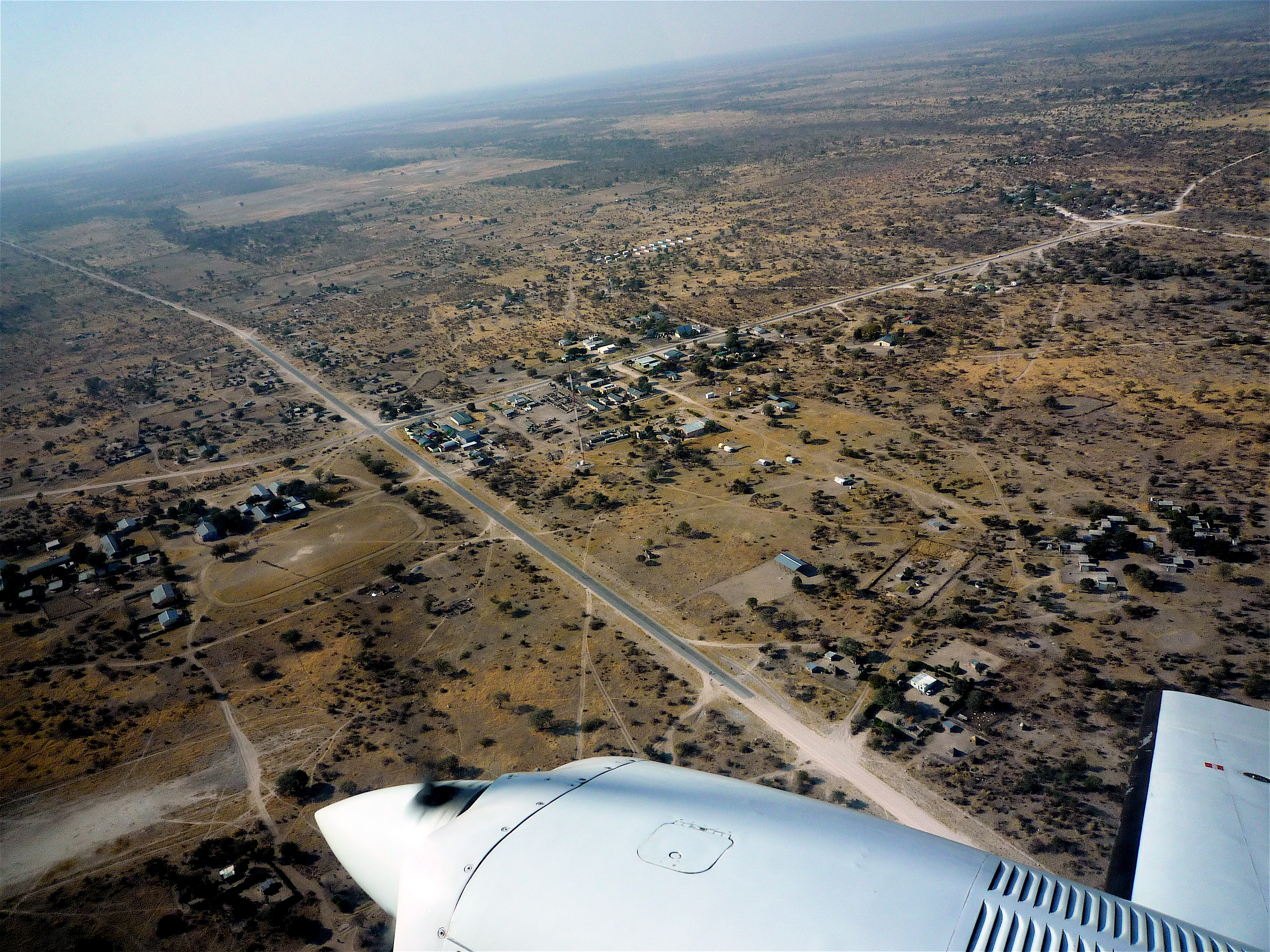

The entire length of the B6 is part of the Trans-Kalahari Corridor route that connects the Namibian harbour town of Walvis Bay via Botswana with Pretoria, the capital of South Africa.

== History ==
District roads between Windhoek and Witvlei and between Witvlei and Gobabis had been proclaimed in 1912 by the colonial administration of German South West Africa. As all other roads at that time these roads were ox wagon tracks cleared of boulders but otherwise unconstructed. The territory had a total of only 5 motor vehicles at that time, and transport by motor vehicle only increased significantly with the deployment of South African troops during World War I.
