= B2 road (Namibia) =

National highway of Namibia

B2 road

- Map of the B2.

Route information
- Maintained by Roads Authority Namibia
- Length: 320 km (200 mi)

Major junctions
- East end: A1 / B1 near Okahandja
- C36 at Wilhelmstal; C33 near Karibib
- West end: C14 in Walvis Bay

Location
- Country: Namibia
- Towns: Okahandja, Karibib, Usakos, Arandis, Swakopmund, Walvis Bay

Highway system
- Transport in Namibia
← B1	→ B3

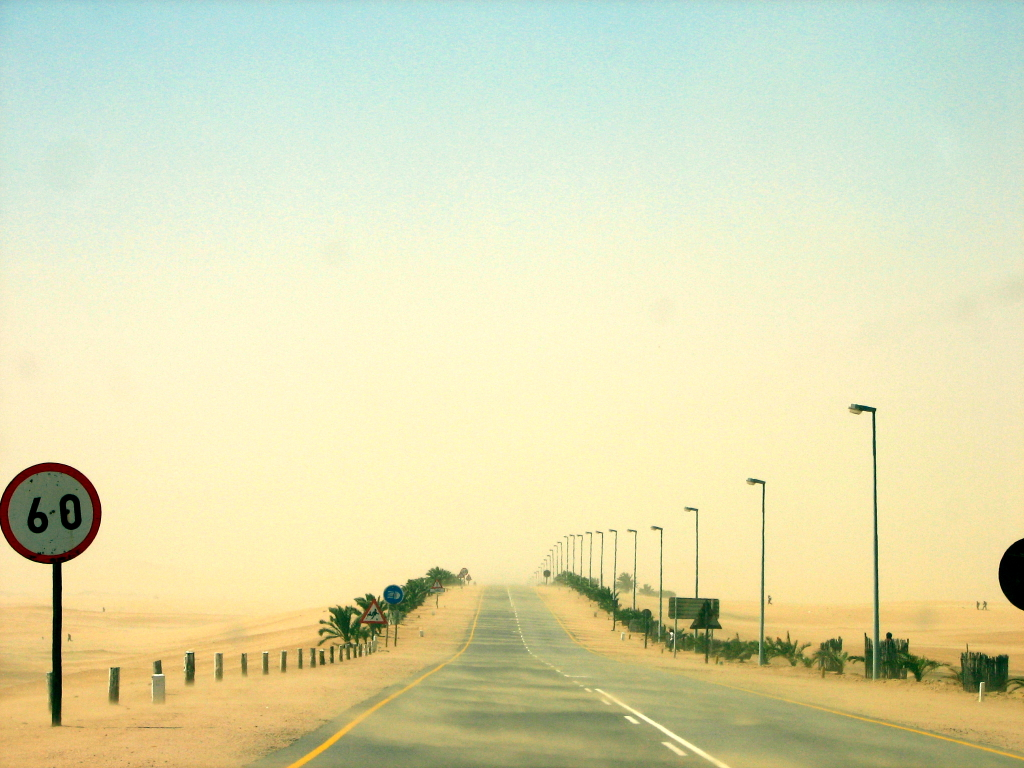
The B2 near Walvis Bay

B2 is a tarred national road in central Namibia. It is 324 km (201 mi) long. The highway runs east–west between the major sea port of Walvis Bay and Okahandja.

The B2's entire route forms the first section of both the Trans-Kalahari Corridor and the Walvis Bay-Ndola-Lubumbashi Development Road. The section between Walvis Bay and Swakopmund was moved in 2021 from the shore of the Atlantic to behind the dune belt, following the route of the existing MR44. This section has been named Dr Hifikepunye Pohamba freeway.

== Route ==
The B2 begins in Walvis Bay at a roundabout intersection with the C14 and heads north along the coast of the South Atlantic Ocean for about 35 km (22 mi) to Swakopmund. The route then heads northeast & east through inland Namibia for 291 km (181 mi) where it ends at an intersection with B1 near Okahandja, approximately 74 km (46 mi) north of the capital Windhoek. The route passes through the Namib-Naukluft National Park and the Namib Desert. Major towns along the route are Arandis, Usakos, and Karibib.
