= Buitepos =

- Settlement
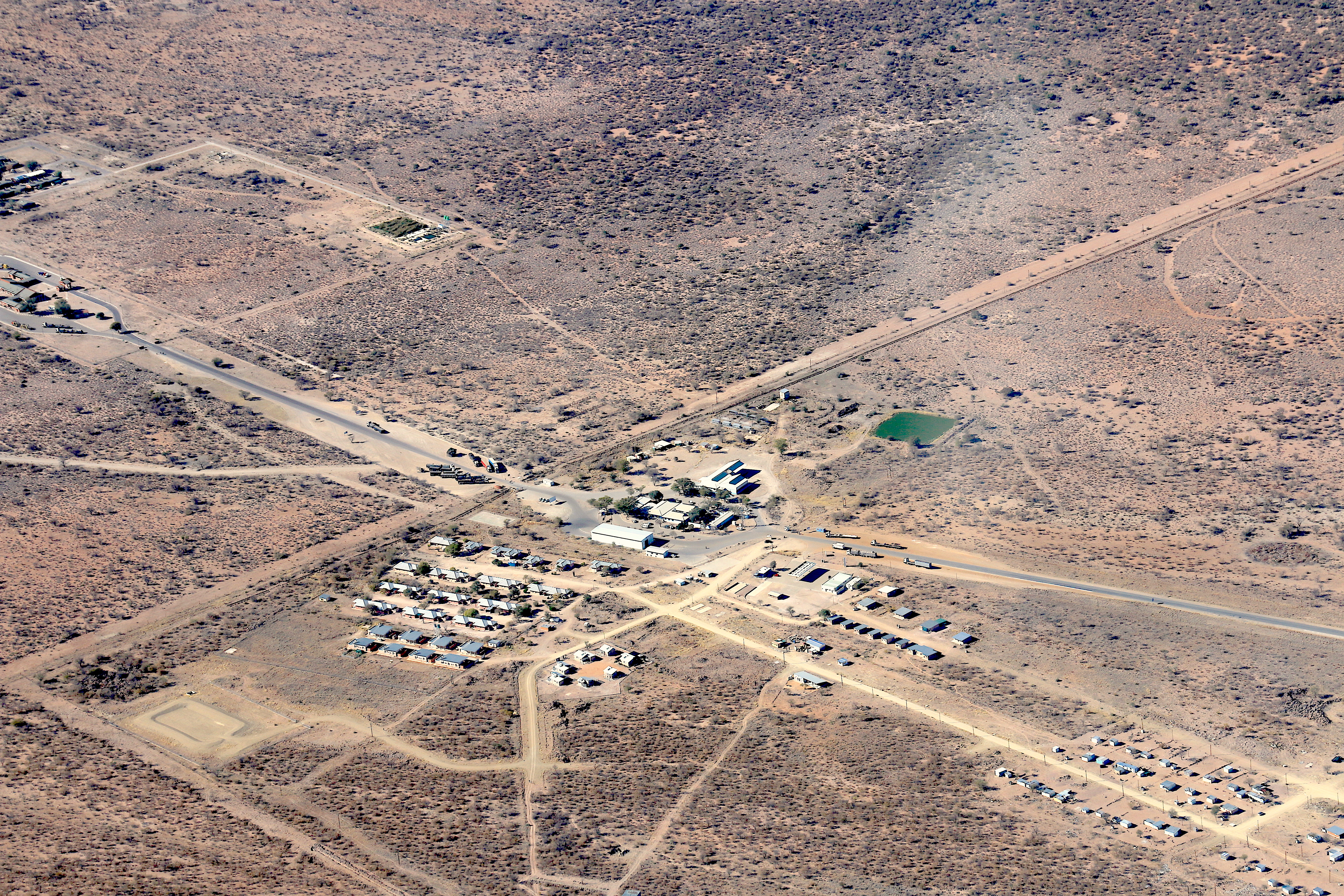
- Buitepos border post. Botswana in upper left part, Namibia in lower right part of the picture

- Location in Namibia
- Coordinates: 22°16′0″S 19°59′0″E
- Country: Namibia
- Region: Omaheke Region
- Constituency: Kalahari Constituency
- Elevation: 4,272 ft (1,302 m)
- Time zone: UTC+2 (SAST)

Buitepos (Afrikaans: outpost) is a small settlement in the Omaheke Region in eastern Namibia. It is situated on the national road B6 which is part of the Trans-Kalahari Highway, and a border post between Namibia and Botswana. The proposed Trans-Kalahari Railway may pass through this place, too.
