= Tsaobis Leopard Park =

Coordinates: 22°25′S 15°59′E

Tsaobis Leopard Park is a private reserve in central Namibia, located south of Omaruru and east of Swakopmund. It was established in 1969 and covers an area of 2349 square kilometers.

After gaining Namibian independence, the park was opened as a tourist farm. In the period from 1958 to 1972, pegmatite was excavated here, from the processing of which the known minerals, aquamarine, tourmaline and heliodor, were derived.
