= Katwitwi =

- Settlement
- Location within Namibia
- Coordinates: 17°23′57″S 18°25′48″E
- Country: Namibia
- Region: Kavango West
- Constituency: Mpungu
- Elevation: 1,113 m (3,652 ft)
- Time zone: UTC+2 (SAST)
- Climate: BSh

Katwitwi is a border crossing in the Kavango West region in the north of Namibia, approximately 35 km northwest of the town of Nkurenkuru. The status as settlement area was granted in 2016. Katwitwi is located on the left bank of the Kavango River at the border to Angola. The border crossing was connected to Tsumeb by the national road B15 in December 2013.
