= Oshivelo =

Settlement in the Oshikoto region of northern Namibia

- Settlement
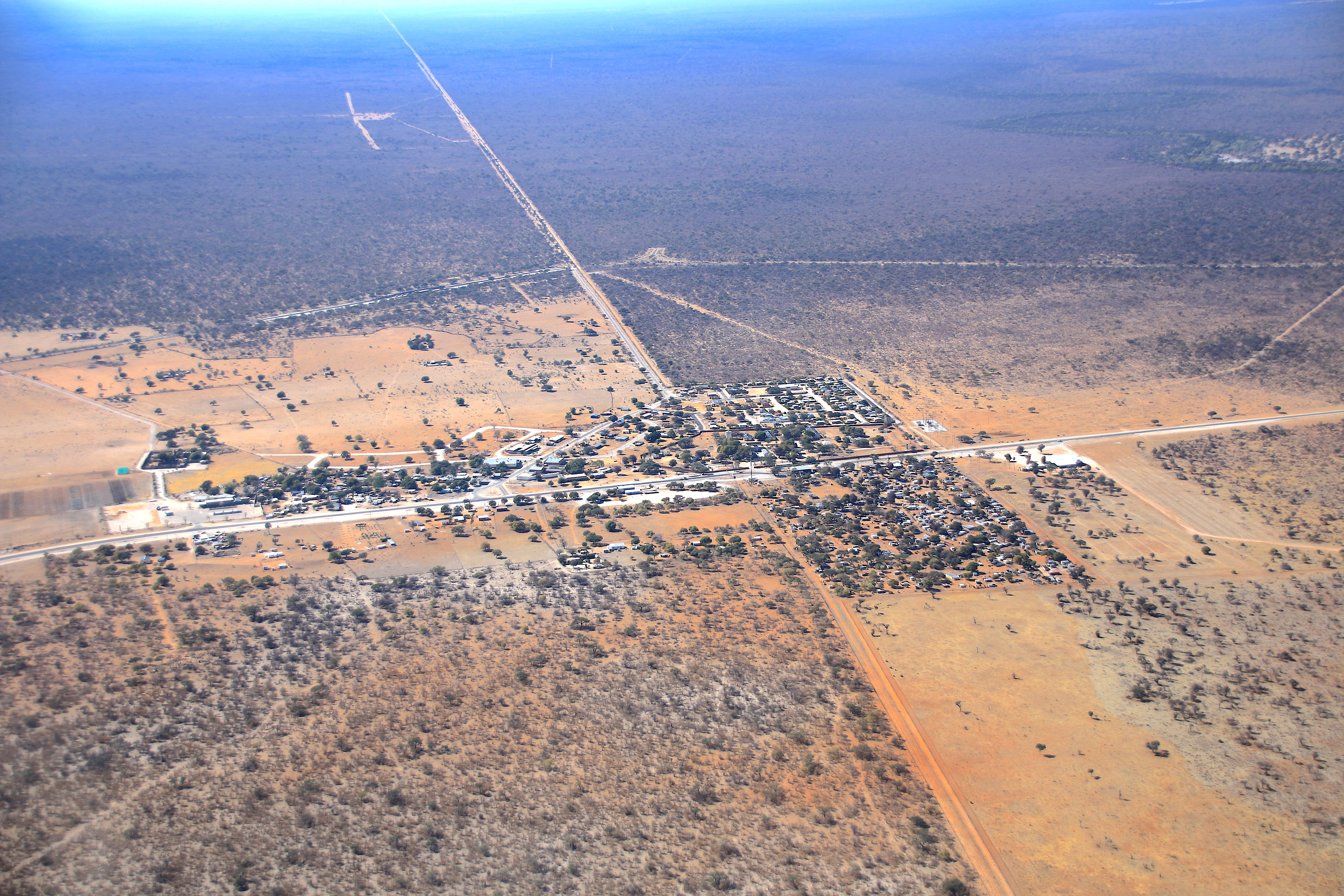
- Aerial view of Oshivelo

- Location in Namibia
- Coordinates: 18°37′S 17°10′E
- Country: Namibia
- Region: Oshikoto Region

Government
  - Headman: Nation Nashikaku
- Elevation: 3,583 ft (1,092 m)
- Time zone: UTC+2 (South African Standard Time)
- Climate: BSh

Oshivelo is a settlement in northern Namibia, located between Omuthiya and Tsumeb in the Oshikoto Region. To its West is Etosha National Park. Oshivelo was proclaimed a settlement in 1998.

== Transport and infrastructure ==
Oshivelo has a clinic which in 2014 was refurbished and named after Catherine Bullen, a woman that died there in 2002 due to inadequate facilities.

In early 2005, the new Northern Railway reached Oshivelo with a 89 kilometres (55 mi) section from Tsumeb. By mid-2006, it had reached Ondangwa, and a train known as the Omugulugwombashe Star traveled weekly on this track until the locomotives broke down.

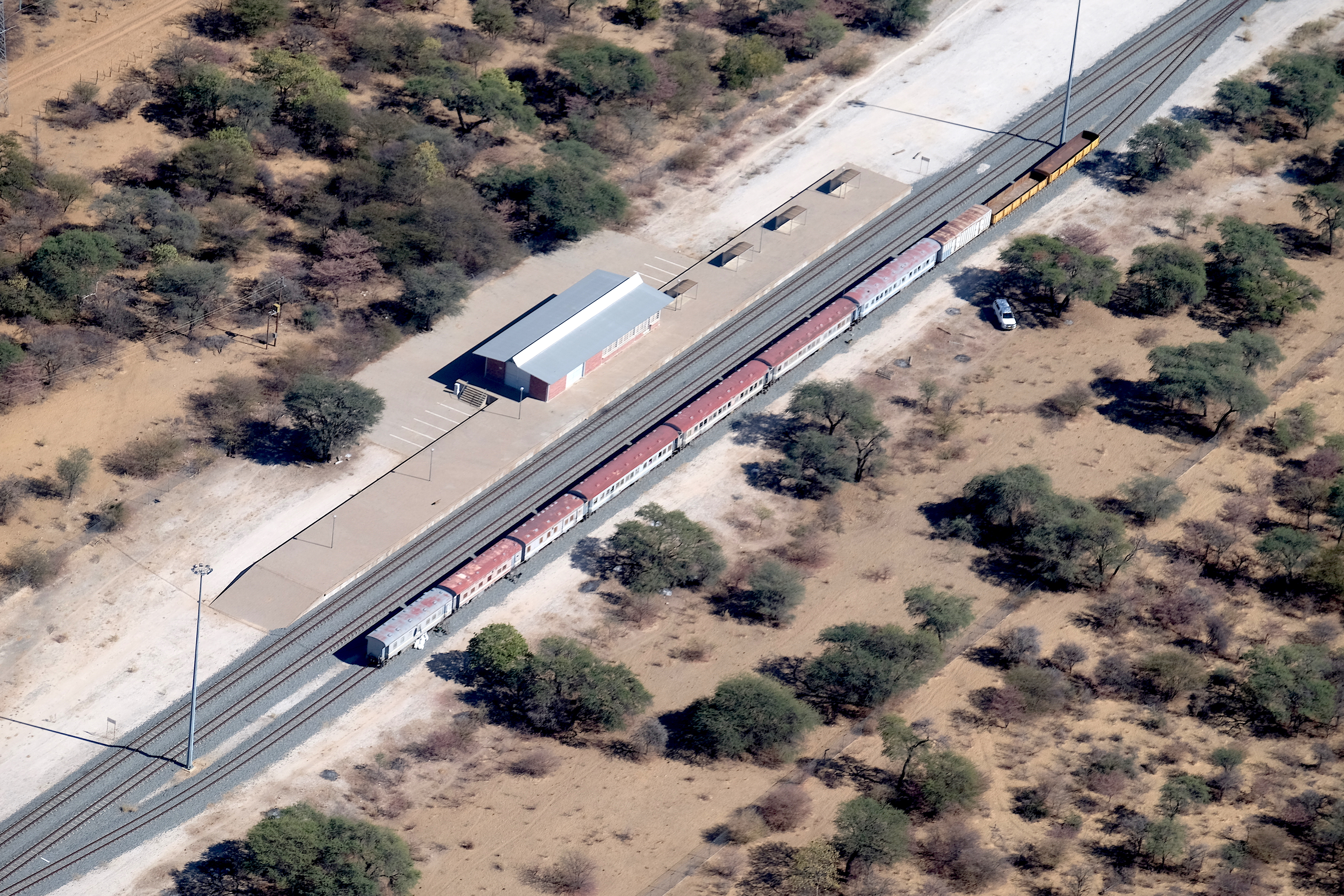
Aerial view of Oshivelo railway station

The Red Line, a veterinary cordon fence separating northern Namibia from the rest of the country, runs through the settlement.
