= B15 road (Namibia) =

National highway of Namibia

B15 road

- Map of the B15.

Route information
- Maintained by Roads Authority Namibia
- Length: 239 km (149 mi)

Major junctions
- South end: B1 at Tsumeb
- North end: B15 at Katwitwi

Location
- Country: Namibia
- Towns: Tsintsabis

Highway system
- Transport in Namibia
← B14	→ C10

The B15 is a national road in Namibia, running since 2013 from Tsumeb via Tsintsabis to the Katwitwi border post with Angola. The road cost 910 million NAD. Construction has been carried out in three phases since 2009 by the Namibian Roads Contractor Company (RCC) and the China Henan International Cooperation Group.
