= Roads in Botswana =

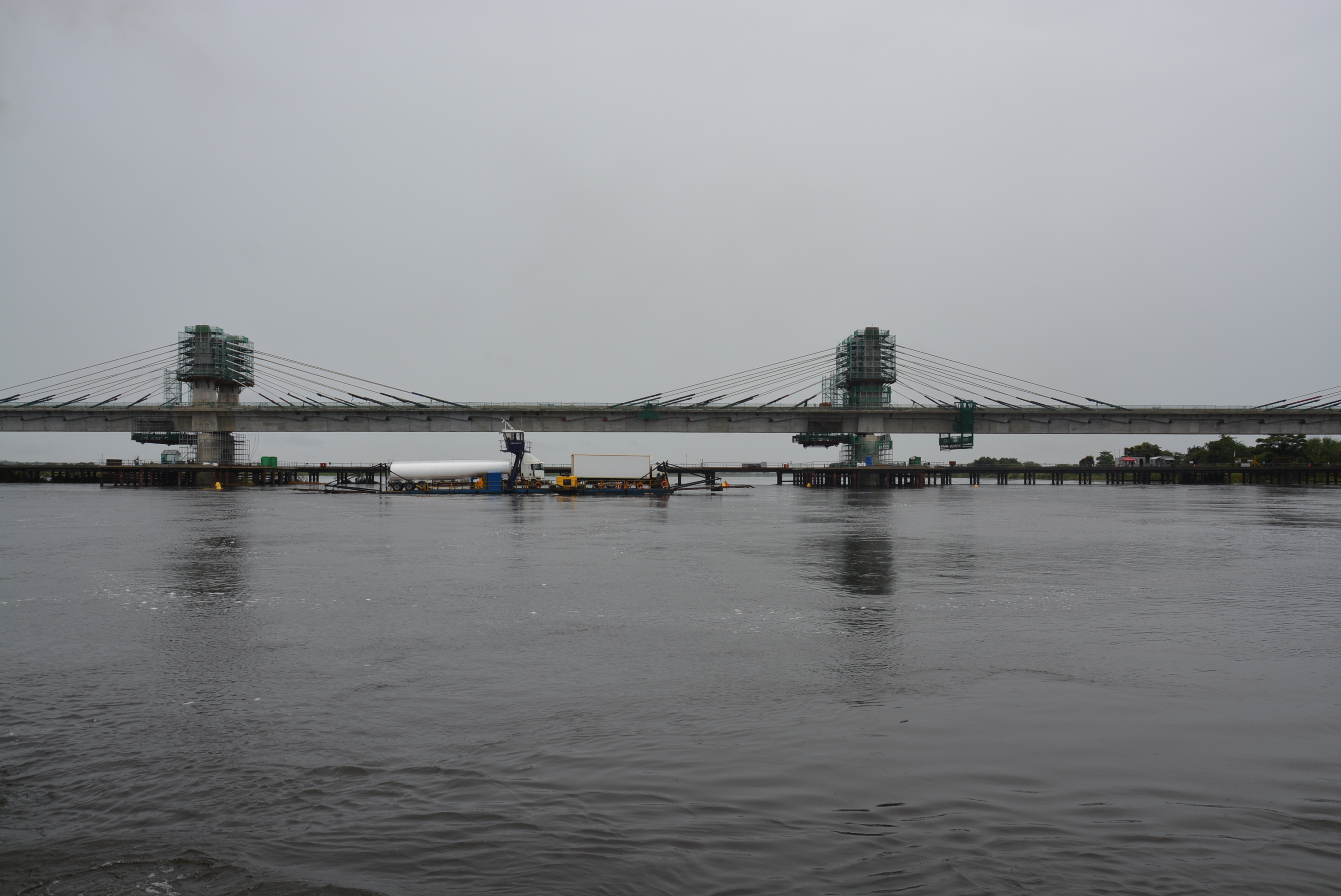
Kazungula Bridge, connecting Botswana and Zambia

Botswana has a network of roads of varied quality and capacity, totaling about 34,873.3 kilometres (21,669.3 mi) as of 2024. Of these, 11,845.3 kilometres (7,360.3 mi) are paved. This includes 134 kilometres (83 mi) of motorways. The remaining 23,028 kilometres (14,309 mi) worth of roads are unpaved. Road distances are shown in kilometers and speed limits are indicated in kilometers per hour (kph) or by the use of the national speed limit (NSL) symbol. Some vehicle categories have various lower maximum limits enforced by speed limits, for example trucks.

== Classification ==
=== Administration ===
Responsibility for the road network differs between trunk and non-trunk routes. Trunk roads, which are the most important roads, are administered by the Ministry of Transport. The classifications of A and B roads are independent of their width and quality. Some B roads are wide enough to accommodate bidirectional traffic, while others are narrower with various passing locations. B roads follow the same numbering scheme as A roads, but almost always have 3- and 4- digit designation.

=== A roads ===
A roads are highways and other major roads.

Name	Terminus	Major Intersection(s)	Terminus
A1	Zimbabwe (A7)	Ramokgwebane (B315), Tshesebe (B311), Francistown (A3, B162), Dikabeya (B151), Serule (A15), Palapye (A14, B140), Mahalapye (B145, B147), Pilane (B130), Gaborone (A10, A12), Ramotswa (A11, B111), Otse (B105), Lobatse (A2), Ramatlabama (B202)	South Africa (N18)
A2	Namibia (B6)	Charles Hill (B214), A3 (south of Ghanzi), Morwamosu (B102), Sekoma (A20), Kanye (A10, B105, B202), Lobatse (A1)	South Africa (N4)
A3	A2	Ghanzi, Sehithwa (A35), Maun (B334), Matopi (B300), Nata (A33), Dukwe (A32), Sebina (A31)	Francistown (A30, A1)
A10	Gaborone (A1, A12)	Thamaga (B111), Mosopa	Kanye (A2, B105, B202)
A11	Ramotswa (A1, B111)	none	South Africa
A12	Morwamosu (A2)	Molepolole (B111, B112), Gaborone (A1)	South Africa (R49)
A14	Orapa (A30, B300)	Serowe (B145)	Palapye (A1, B140)
A15	Serule (A1)	none	Selebi Phikwe (B157, B150)
A20	Sekoma (A2)	Khakhea (B205)	Tshabong (B210, B211)
A30	Orapa (A14, B300)	none	Francistown (A3)
A31	Tutume	none	Sebina (A3)
A32	Sowa	none	Dukwe (A3)
A33	Namibia	Muchenje, Kasane, Pangamatenga (B333)	Nata (A3)
A35	Namibia	Shakawe	Sehithwa (A3)

=== B roads ===
B roads are distributor roads, which see less traffic than A roads.

Name	Terminus	Major Intersection(s)	Terminus
B105	Kanye (A2, A10, B202)	none	Otse (A1)
B111	Molepolole (A12, B102, B112)	Thamaga (A10)	Ramotswa (A1, A11)
B112	Shoshong (B145)	none	Molepolole (A12, B102, B111)
B122	Lentsweletau (B123)	Kopong	Metsimotlhabe (A12)
B123	Lentsweletau (B122)	Mahetlwe	Hatsalatladi
B127	Letlhakeng (A12)	none	Khudumelapye
B130	Pilane (A1)	Mochudi, Sikwane (B135)	South Africa
B135	Malolwane	none	Sikwane (B130)
B140	Palapye (A1, A14)	Sherwood (B141)	South Africa (Grobler's Bridge/N11)
B141	Machaneng (B147, B148)	none	Sherwood (B140)
B145	Serowe (A14)	Shoshong (B112)	Mahalapye (A1, B147)
B147	Mahalapye (A1, B145)	none	Machaneng (B141, B148)
B148	B140	none	Machaneng (B141, B147)
B150	Selebi Phikwe (A15)	Sefophe (B151)	Tsetsebjwe
B151	Dikabeya (A1)	Sefophe (B150), Bobonong (B155)	Kobojango
B155	Bobonong (B150)	none	Molalatau
B157	Mmadinare	none	Selebi Phikwe (A15)
B162	Francistown (A1, A3)	none	Matsiloje
B202	Kanye (A, A10, B105)	none	Ramatlabana (A1)
B205	A2	Khakhea (A20), then goes southward with no known terminus	?
B210	Tshabong (A20, B211)	none	South Africa (R380)
B211	South Africa (near R360)	Bokspits	Tshabong (A20, B211)
B214	Charles Hill (A2)	none	Ncojane
B300	Matopi (A3)	Rakops	Orapa (A14, A30)
B311	Masunga (B316)	none	Tshesebe (A1)
B315	Zwenshambe (B316)	Moroka	Ramokgwebane (A1)
B316	Zwenshambe (B315)	none	Masunga (B311)
B333	A33	Pandamatenga	Zimbabwe
B334	Shorobe	none	Maun (A3)

=== Motorways ===
Motorways in Botswana have a set of restrictions, which prohibit certain traffic from using the road. The following classes of traffic are not allowed on Botswana motorways:

- Learner drivers
- Slow vehicles (i.e., not capable of reaching 60 km/h on a level road).
- Invalid carriages (lightweight three-wheeled vehicles)
- Pedestrians
- Pedal-cycles (bicycles, etc.)
- Vehicles under 50cc (e.g., mopeds)
- Tractors
- Animals

Rules for driving on motorways include the following:

- The keep-left rule applies unless overtaking
- No stopping at any time
- No reversing
- No hitchhiking
- Only vehicles that travel faster than 80 km/h may use the outside lane
- No driving on the hard-shoulder

The general motorway speed limit is 120 km/h.

=== Signage ===
Signage on the Botswana network conforms broadly to Southern Africa norms, though a number of signs omit Southern Africa route numbers. All length distances are shown in kilometers, speed is in kilometers per hour whilst height and width restrictions are required to be shown in feet and inches (though the metric measurements may optionally also appear).

Botswana's old "caution curves" sign

New sign

Traditionally, road signs in Botswana used blue backgrounds rather than the yellow, white, or orange that the rest of the world uses on traffic warning signs. In the early 2010s, officials announced plans to begin phasing out the distinctive blue signs in favor of more typical signs to be more in line with the neighboring Southern African Development Community member states.

== See also ==
- Botswana
- Transport in Botswana
