= List of bridges in Botswana =

== Major bridges ==
	Name	Span	Length	Type	Carries Crosses	Opened	Location	District	Ref.
1	Okavango River Bridge	200 m (660 ft)	1,161 m (3,809 ft)	Cable-stayed; Composite steel/concrete deck, steel pylons 100+200+100	Road bridge Okavango River	2022	Shakawe–Goa; 18°16′22.8″S 21°47′43.4″E	North-West District	
2	Kazungula Bridge	129 m (423 ft)	923 m (3,028 ft)	Extradosed; Concrete box girder deck, 6 concrete pylons Rail-road bridge 54+85+5x129+85+54	A33 road Mosetse–Kazungula–Livingstone Railway; Zambezi	2020	Kasane–Kazungula; 17°47′28.4″S 25°15′45.0″E	Chobe District; Zambia	(Note: The Kazungula Bridge is situated where the borders of Botswana, Namibia, Zambia, and Zimbabwe come together at the confluence of the Cuando (also called Chobe) and Zambezi rivers, but it only crosses the Botswana–Zambia border.)

== See also ==
- Transport in Botswana
- Roads in Botswana
- Rail transport in Botswana
- Geography of Botswana
- List of rivers of Botswana
- List of crossings of the Zambezi River
