= List of countries by road network size =

This is a list of countries (or regions) by total road network size, both paved and unpaved. Also included is additional data on road network density and the length of each country or region's controlled-access highway network (also known as a motorway, expressway, freeway, etc.), designed for high vehicular traffic.

Unless otherwise noted, the data is from the United States's Central Intelligence Agency.

| Country/Territory | Total (km) | Density (km/ 100 km^{2}) | Paved (km) | Paved (%) | Unpaved (km) | Unpaved (%) | Controlled -access (km) | Controlled -access (%) | Source & year | 4-Lane or Above (km) |
|---|---|---|---|---|---|---|---|---|---|---|
| World | 64,718,646 | 48 | —N/a | | —N/a | | —N/a | | 2024 | - |
| India | 6,700,000 | 204 | 4,500,000 | 67% | 2,200,000 | 33% | 7,992 | 0.1% | 2025 | 48568 |
| United States | 6,586,610 | 67 | 4,304,715 | 65% | 2,281,895 | 35% | 76,334 | 1.2% | 2023 | 120000 |
| China | 5,490,400 | 57 | 5,344,700 | 97% | 145,700 | 3% | 190,700 | 3.5% | 2024 | 199400 |
| Brazil | 2,000,000 | 23 | 214,000 | 11% | 1,786,000 | 89% | 17,000 | 0.9% | 2023. | 11000 |
| Russia | 1,579,291 | 9 | 1,124,116 | 71% | 455,175 | 29% | 4,923 | 0.3% (Note: St. Petersburg M-11 to Krasnodar by M-4 – 2024 km of expressway) | 2023 | 14500 |
| Japan | 1,218,772 | 322 | 992,835 | 81% | 225,937 | 19% | 30,469 | 2.5% | 2021 | 23000 |
| France | 1,053,215 | 191 | 1,053,215 | 100% | 0 | 0% | 11,671 | 1.1% | 2011 | 16000 |
| Canada | 1,042,300 | 10 | 415,600 | 40% | 626,700 | 60% | 17,041 | 1.6% | 2014 | 17000 |
| Australia | 977,874 | 13 | 403,214 | 41% | 574,660 | 59% | 1,716 | 0.2% | 2017 | 7500 |
| Mexico | 836,603 | 43 | 175,526 | 21% | 641,986 | 79% | 11,094 | 1.4% | 2023 | |
| Germany | 830,000 | 232 | 830,000 | 100% | 0 | 0% | 16,365 | 2.5% | 2022 | |
| South Africa | 750,000 | 61 | 158,124 | 21% | 591,876 | 79% | 1,927 | 0.3% | 2016 | |
| Thailand | 702,989 | 137 | —N/a | | —N/a | | 634 | 0.1% | 2020 | |
| Spain | 683,175 | 135 | 683,175 | 100% | 0 | 0% | 17,228 | 2.5% | 2020 | |
| Malaysia | 589,320 | 178 | 418,901 | 71% | 170,419 | 29% | 5,027 | 0.9% | 2025 | |
| Sweden | 573,134 | 127 | 140,100 | 24% | 433,034 | 76% | 2,050 | 0.4% | 2016 | |
| Vietnam | 570,448 | 172 | 280,663 | 49% | 289,785 | 51% | 1,276 | 0.2% | 2019 | |
| Indonesia | 548,097 | 29 | 329,189 | 60% | 218,908 | 40% | 3,092 | 0.6% | 2025 | |
| Italy | 487,700 | 162 | 487,700 | 100% | 0 | 0% | 6,700 | 1.4% | 2007 | |
| Finland | 454,000 | 135 | 78,000 | 17% | 350,000 | 77% | 863 | 0.2% | 2019 | |
| Turkey | 438,633 | 56 | 344,403 | 79% | 94,630 | 22% | 3,796 | 0.9% | 2024 | |
| Poland | 429,800 | 137 | 293,800 | 68% | 136,000 | 32% | 5,586 | 1.3% | 2026 | |
| United Kingdom | 424,129 | 175 | 424,129 | 100% | 0 | 0% | 3,701 | 0.9% (Note: Motorways) | 2020 | |
| Bangladesh | 369,105 | 250 | 110,311 | 30% | 258,794 | 70% | 55 | 0.0% | 2018 | |
| Egypt | 325,250 | 32 | 240,000 | 74% | 85,250 | 26% | 1,034 | 0.3% | 2024 | |
| Pakistan | 264,175 | 30 | 185,463 | 70% | 78,712 | 30% | 2,567 | 1.0% | 2025 | |
| Argentina | 240,000 | 9 | 81,355 | 34% | 158,645 | 66% | 4,423 | 1.8% | 2017 | |
| Iran | 223,485 | 14 | 195,485 | 87% | 28,000 | 13% | —N/a | | 2018 | |
| Saudi Arabia | 221,372 | 10 | 47,529 | 21% | 173,843 | 79% | 3,891 | 1.8% | 2006 | |
| Philippines | 216,387 | 72 | 61,093 | 28% | 155,294 | 72% | 626 | 0.3% | 2020 | |
| Hungary | 210,791 | 227 | 77,087 | 37% | 126,514 | 60% | 1,481 | 0.7% | 2018 | |
| Uzbekistan | 209,496 | 47 | 120,289 | 57% | 89,207 | 43% | 0 | 0.0% | 2021 | |
| Colombia | 204,389 | 18 | 32,280 | 16% | 172,109 | 84% | 2,100 | 1.0% | 2021 | |
| Nigeria | 195,000 | 21 | 60,000 | 31% | 135,000 | 69% | —N/a | | 2017 | |
| Kenya | 177,800 | 30 | 14,420 | 8% | 163,380 | 92% | —N/a | | 2018 | |
| Peru | 175,589 | 14 | 29,579 | 17% | 146,010 | 83% | 827 | 0% | 2021 | |
| Ukraine | 169,694 | 28 | 166,095 | 98% | 3,599 | 2% | 17 | 0.0% | 2012 | |
| Myanmar | 157,000 | 23 | 34,700 | 22% | 122,300 | 78% | —N/a | | 2013 | |
| DR Congo | 152,373 | 6 | 3,047 | 2% | 149,326 | 98% | —N/a | | 2015 | |
| Uganda | 146,000 | 60 | 4,257 | 3% | 141,743 | 97% | —N/a | | 2019 | |
| Algeria | 145,615 | 6 | 117,000 | 92% | 24,000 | 19% | —N/a | | 2026 | |
| Tanzania | 145,203 | 16 | 11,201 | 8% | 134,002 | 74% | —N/a | | 2022 | |
| Mali | 139,107 | 11 | 0 | 0% | 139,107 | 100% | —N/a | | 2018 | |
| Netherlands | 141,820 | 341 | —N/a | | —N/a | | 3,530 | 2.5% | 2022 | |
| Austria | 126,400 | 151 | —N/a | | —N/a | | 2,258 | 1.8% | 2021 | |
| Ethiopia | 120,171 | 11 | 0 | 0% | 120,171 | 100% | —N/a | | 2018 | |
| Belgium | 118,414 | 388 | 118,414 | 100% | 0 | 0% | 1,747 | 1.5% | 2015 | |
| Greece | 117,000 | 89 | 117,000 | 100% | 0 | 0% | 2,368 | 2.0% | 2018 | |
| Sri Lanka | 114,093 | 174 | 16,977 | 15% | 97,116 | 85% | —N/a | | 2010 | |
| Mongolia | 113,200 | 7 | 10,600 | 9% | 102,600 | 91% | —N/a | | 2017 | |
| South Korea | 110,714 | 111 | 92,795 | 84% | 7,633 | 7% | 4,767 | 4.3% | 2018 | |
| Ghana | 109,515 | 46 | 13,787 | 13% | 95,728 | 87% | —N/a | | 2009 | |
| United Arab Emirates | 104,311 | 125 | 104,311 | 100% | 0 | 0% | 253 | 0.2% | 2026 | |
| Ireland | 99,830 | 142 | 99,830 | 100% | —N/a | | 2,717 | 3% | 2018 | |
| Norway | 97,746 | 25 | —N/a | | —N/a | | 1,089 | 1% | 2025 | |
| Zimbabwe | 97,267 | 25 | 18,481 | 19% | 78,786 | 81% | —N/a | | 2019 | |
| New Zealand | 96,817 | 36 | 64,957 | 67% | 31,860 | 33% | 232 | 0.2% | 2020 | |
| Venezuela | 96,189 | 11 | —N/a | | —N/a | | —N/a | | 2014 | |
| Israel | 95,992 | 435 | 95,992 | 100% | 0 | 0% | 449 | 0.5% | 2025 | |
| Kazakhstan | 95,409 | 4 | 13,787 | 14% | 95,728 | 100% | —N/a | | 2017 | |
| Romania | 86,847 | 36 | 65,315 | 75% | 21,532 | 25% | 1,418 | 2% | 2026 | |
| Chile | 85,983 | 11 | 21,289 | 25% | 64,695 | 75% | 3,347 | 4% | 2020 | |
| Lithuania | 84,166 | 129 | 72,297 | 86% | 11,869 | 14% | 309 | 0% | 2014 | |
| Switzerland | 84,114 | 204 | —N/a | | —N/a | | 1,544 | 1.8% | 2021 | |
| Nepal | 80,078 | 54 | 19,163 | 24% | 60,915 | 76% | —N/a | | 2025 | |
| Azerbaijan | 77,824 | 90 | 20,524 | 26% | 57,300 | 74% | —N/a | | 2021 | |
| Uruguay | 77,732 | 44 | 7,743 | 10% | 69,989 | 90% | —N/a | | 2010 | |
| Angola | 76,000 | 6 | 13,680 | 18% | 62,320 | 82% | —N/a | | 2020 | |
| Denmark | 73,574 | 171 | —N/a | | —N/a | | 1,298 | 1.8% | 2010 | |
| Zambia | 67,671 | 9 | 14,888 | 22% | 52,783 | 78% | —N/a | | 2018 | |
| Morocco | 57,334 | 8 | 45,240 | 79% | 12,094 | 21% | —N/a | | 2022 | |
| Czech Republic | 55,744 | 71 | 55,744 | 100% | —N/a | | 1,252 | 2% | 2018 | |
| Cambodia | 55,000 | 30 | 12,239 | 22% | 35,024 | 64% | —N/a | | 2014 | |
| Serbia | 45,419 | 51 | 45,419 | 100% | 0 | 0% | 1,060 | 2.3% | 2024 | |
| Ecuador | 43,216 | 17 | 8,161 | 19% | 35,055 | 81% | —N/a | | 2015 | |
| Taiwan | 41,475 | 115 | 42,793 | 103% | 413 | 1% | 1,053 | 2.5% | 2019 | |
| Chad | 40,000 | 3 | 25,000 | 63% | 15,000 | 38% | —N/a | | 2018 | |
| Laos | 39,586 | 17 | 5,415 | 14% | 34,171 | 86% | —N/a | | 2009 | |
| Slovakia | 38,985 | 80 | 56,926 | 146% | 765 | 2% | —N/a | | 2018 | |
| Slovenia | 38,985 | 192 | 38,985 | 100% | 0 | 0% | 769 | 2.0% | 2012 | |
| Libya | 37,000 | 2 | 34,000 | 92% | 3,000 | 8% | —N/a | | 2010 | |
| Afghanistan | 34,903 | 5 | 17,903 | 51% | 17,000 | 49% | —N/a | | 2021 | |
| Kyrgyzstan | 34,000 | 17 | 0 | 0% | 34,000 | 100% | —N/a | | 2018 | |
| Botswana | 31,747 | 5 | 9,810 | 31% | 21,937 | 69% | —N/a | | 2017 | |
| Madagascar | 31,640 | 5 | 0 | 0% | 31,640 | 100% | —N/a | | 2018 | |
| Mozambique | 31,083 | 4 | 7,365 | 24% | 23,718 | 76% | —N/a | | 2015 | |
| Sudan | 31,000 | 2 | 8,000 | 26% | 23,000 | 74% | —N/a | | 2019 | |
| Tajikistan | 30,000 | 21 | 0 | 0% | 30,000 | 100% | —N/a | | 2018 | |
| Croatia | 26,958 | 48 | 0 | 0% | 26,958 | 100% | 1,416 | 5.3% | 2015 | |
| Puerto Rico | 26,862 | 303 | 0 | 0% | 26,862 | 100% | 454 | 1.7% | 2012 | |
| North Korea | 25,554 | 21 | 724 | 3% | 24,830 | 97% | —N/a | | 2006 | |
| Central African Republic | 24,000 | 4 | 700 | 3% | 23,300 | 97% | —N/a | | 2018 | |
| Nicaragua | 23,897 | 18 | 3,346 | 14% | 20,551 | 86% | —N/a | | 2014 | |
| Congo | 23,324 | 7 | 3,111 | 13% | 20,213 | 87% | —N/a | | 2017 | |
| Bosnia and Herzegovina | 22,926 | 45 | 19,426 | 85% | 3,500 | 15% | —N/a | | 2010 | |
| Jamaica | 22,121 | 201 | 16,148 | 73% | 5,973 | 27% | 44 | 0.2% | 2011 | |
| Lebanon | 21,705 | 208 | 0 | 0% | 21,705 | 100% | —N/a | | 2017 | |
| Georgia | 20,295 | 29 | 0 | 0% | 20,295 | 100% | —N/a | | 2018 | |
| Tunisia | 19,750 | 12 | 12,750 | 65% | 7,000 | 35% | —N/a | | 2023 | |
| Cyprus | 19,901 | 215 | 12,901 | 65% | 8,631 | 43% | 272 | 1.4% | 2016 | |
| Dominican Republic | 19,705 | 41 | 9,872 | 50% | 9,833 | 50% | —N/a | | 2002 | |
| Bulgaria | 19,512 | 18 | 19,235 | 99% | 277 | 1% | 863 | 4.4% | 2023 | |
| Niger | 18,949 | 1 | 3,912 | 21% | 15,037 | 79% | —N/a | | 2010 | |
| Guatemala | 17,621 | 16 | 7,489 | 43% | 10,132 | 57% | —N/a | | 2016 | |
| Senegal | 16,665 | 8 | 6,126 | 37% | 10,539 | 63% | 241 | 1.4% | 2017 | |
| Paraguay | 16,630 | 4 | —N/a | | —N/a | | 122 | 1% | 2023 | |
| Benin | 16,000 | 14 | 1,400 | 9% | 14,600 | 91% | —N/a | | 2006 | |
| Eritrea | 16,000 | 14 | 1,600 | 10% | 14,400 | 90% | —N/a | | 2018 | |
| Malawi | 15,452 | 13 | 4,074 | 26% | 11,378 | 74% | —N/a | | 2015 | |
| Burkina Faso | 15,304 | 6 | 3,642 | 24% | 11,662 | 76% | —N/a | | 2014 | |
| Somalia | 15,000 | 2 | 0 | 0% | 15,000 | 100% | —N/a | | 2018 | |
| Honduras | 14,742 | 13 | 3,367 | 23% | 11,375 | 77% | —N/a | | 2012 | |
| Gabon | 14,300 | 5 | 900 | 6% | 13,400 | 94% | —N/a | | 2001 | |
| North Macedonia | 14,182 | 55 | 9,633 | 68% | 4,549 | 32% | 312 | 2.2% | 2017 | |
| Iceland | 12,898 | 13 | 5,647 | 44% | 7,251 | 56% | —N/a | | 2012 | |
| Burundi | 12,322 | 44 | 1,500 | 12% | 10,822 | 88% | —N/a | | 2016 | |
| Mauritania | 12,253 | 1 | 3,988 | 33% | 8,265 | 67% | —N/a | | 2018 | |
| Bhutan | 12,205 | 32 | 437 | 4% | 11,768 | 96% | —N/a | | 2017 | |
| Togo | 11,734 | 21 | 1,794 | 15% | 9,940 | 85% | —N/a | | 2020 | |
| Sierra Leone | 11,700 | 16 | 1,051 | 9% | 10,650 | 91% | —N/a | | 2015 | |
| Liberia | 10,600 | 10 | 657 | 6% | 9,943 | 94% | —N/a | | 2018 | |
| Moldova | 9,352 | 28 | 8,835 | 94% | 517 | 6% | —N/a | | 2012 | |
| Papua New Guinea | 9,349 | 2 | 3,000 | 32% | 6,349 | 68% | —N/a | | 2011 | |
| El Salvador | 9,012 | 43 | 5,341 | 59% | 3,671 | 41% | —N/a | | 2017 | |
| Montenegro | 7,762 | 56 | 7,141 | 92% | 621 | 8% | —N/a | | 2010 | |
| Armenia | 7,700 | 26 | 3,780 | 49% | 3,920 | 51% | —N/a | | 2019 | |
| Jordan | 7,203 | 8 | 7,203 | 100% | 0 | 0% | —N/a | | 2011 | |
| Qatar | 7,039 | 61 | 7039 | 100% | 0 | 0% | —N/a | | 2016 | |
| Timor-Leste | 6,040 | 40 | 2,600 | 43% | 3,440 | 57% | —N/a | | 2008 | |
| Lesotho | 5,940 | 20 | 1,069 | 18% | 4,871 | 82% | —N/a | | 2011 | |
| Kuwait | 5,749 | 32 | 4,887 | 85% | 862 | 15% | —N/a | | 2018 | |
| New Caledonia | 5,622 | 30 | 0 | 0% | 5,622 | 100% | 31.5 | 0.6% | 2006 | |
| Costa Rica | 5,035 | 10 | 0 | 0% | 5,035 | 100% | —N/a | | 2017 | |
| Rwanda | 4,700 | 18 | 1,534 | 33% | 3,493 | 74% | —N/a | | 2021 | |
| West Bank | 4,686 | 78 | 4,686 | 100% | 0 | 0% | —N/a | | 2010 | |
| Guinea-Bissau | 4,400 | 12 | 453 | 10% | 3,947 | 90% | —N/a | | 2018 | |
| Suriname | 4,304 | 3 | 1,119 | 26% | 3,185 | 74% | —N/a | | 2003 | |
| Haiti | 4,266 | 15 | 768 | 18% | 3,498 | 82% | —N/a | | 2009 | |
| Bahrain | 4,122 | 537 | 3,392 | 82% | 730 | 18% | —N/a | | 2010 | |
| Guyana | 3,995 | 2 | 799 | 20% | 3,196 | 80% | —N/a | | 2019 | |
| Albania | 3,945 | 14 | 0 | 0% | 3,945 | 100% | —N/a | | 2018 | |
| Eswatini | 3,769 | 22 | 0 | 0% | 3,769 | 100% | —N/a | | 2019 | |
| Singapore | 3,500 | 489 | 3,500 | 100% | 0 | 0% | 164 | 4.7% | 2017 | |
| Fiji | 3,440 | 19 | 1,686 | 49% | 1,754 | 51% | —N/a | | 2011 | |
| Belize | 3,281 | 14 | 601 | 18% | 2,680 | 82% | —N/a | | 2017 | |
| Gambia | 2,977 | 26 | 518 | 17% | 2,459 | 83% | —N/a | | 2011 | |
| Brunei | 2,976 | 52 | 2,559 | 86% | 417 | 14% | —N/a | | 2014 | |
| Djibouti | 2,893 | 12 | 0 | 0% | 2,893 | 100% | —N/a | | 2013 | |
| Equatorial Guinea | 2,880 | 10 | 0 | 0% | 2,880 | 100% | —N/a | | 2017 | |
| Luxembourg | 2,875 | 111 | 0 | 0% | 2,875 | 100% | —N/a | | 2019 | |
| Bahamas | 2,700 | 19 | 1,620 | 60% | 1,080 | 40% | —N/a | | 2011 | |
| French Polynesia | 2,590 | 65 | 1,735 | 67% | 855 | 33% | —N/a | | 1999 | |
| Mauritius | 2,428 | 123 | 2,379 | 98% | 49 | 2% | 99 | 4.1% | 2015 | |
| Malta | 2,254 | 713 | 1,973 | 88% | 281 | 12% | —N/a | | 2001 | |
| Hong Kong | 2,107 | 191 | 2,107 | 100% | 0 | 0% | —N/a | | 2017 | |
| Marshall Islands | 2,028 | 1,120 | 75 | 4% | 1,953 | 96% | —N/a | | 2007 | |
| Barbados | 1,700 | 395 | 1,700 | 100% | 0 | 0% | —N/a | | 2015 | |
| Dominica | 1,512 | 201 | 762 | 50% | 750 | 50% | —N/a | | 2018 | |
| Solomon Islands | 1,390 | 5 | 34 | 2% | 1,356 | 98% | —N/a | | 2011 | |
| Cape Verde | 1,350 | 33 | 932 | 69% | 418 | 31% | —N/a | | 2013 | |
| São Tomé and Príncipe | 1,300 | 135 | 230 | 18% | 1,070 | 82% | —N/a | | 2018 | |
| U.S. Virgin Islands | 1,260 | 363 | 0 | 0% | 1,260 | 100% | —N/a | | 2008 | |
| Saint Lucia | 1,210 | 224 | 847 | 70% | 363 | 30% | —N/a | | 2011 | |
| Antigua and Barbuda | 1,170 | 265 | 386 | 33% | 784 | 67% | —N/a | | 2011 | |
| Samoa | 1,150 | 40 | 0 | 0% | 1,150 | 100% | —N/a | | 2018 | |
| Grenada | 1,127 | 328 | 902 | 80% | 225 | 20% | —N/a | | 2017 | |
| Isle of Man | 1,107 | 571 | 500 | 100% | 0 | 0% | —N/a | | 2008 | |
| Vanuatu | 1,070 | 9 | 256 | 24% | 814 | 76% | —N/a | | 2000 | |
| Guam | 1,045 | 190 | 0 | 0% | 1,045 | 100% | —N/a | | 2008 | |
| Faroe Islands | 960 | 69 | 500 | 52% | 460 | 48% | —N/a | | 2017 | |
| Comoros | 880 | 39 | 673 | 76% | 207 | 24% | —N/a | | 2002 | |
| Cayman Islands | 785 | 297 | 785 | 100% | 0 | 0% | —N/a | | 2007 | |
| Tonga | 680 | 91 | 184 | 27% | 496 | 73% | —N/a | | 2011 | |
| Kiribati | 670 | 92 | 0 | 0% | 670 | 100% | —N/a | | 2017 | |
| Liechtenstein | 630 | 394 | 0 | 0% | 630 | 100% | —N/a | | 2019 | |
| Jersey | 576 | 497 | 0 | 0% | 576 | 100% | —N/a | | 2010 | |
| Curaçao | 550 | 124 | 0 | 0% | 550 | 100% | —N/a | | | |
| Northern Mariana Islands | 536 | 117 | 0 | 0% | 536 | 100% | —N/a | | 2008 | |
| Seychelles | 526 | 115 | 514 | 98% | 12 | 2% | —N/a | | 2015 | |
| Greenland | 500 | 0 | 500 | 100% | 0 | 0% | —N/a | | 2015 | |
| Bermuda | 447 | 843 | 447 | 100% | 0 | 0% | —N/a | | 2010 | |
| Falkland Islands | 440 | 4 | 50 | 11% | 390 | 89% | —N/a | | 2008 | |
| Macau | 428 | 1,427 | 428 | 100% | 0 | 0% | —N/a | | 2017 | |
| Saint Kitts and Nevis | 383 | 147 | 163 | 43% | 220 | 57% | —N/a | | 2002 | |
| Andorra | 320 | 68 | 0 | 0% | 320 | 100% | —N/a | | 2019 | |
| Cook Islands | 295 | 125 | 207 | 70% | 88 | 30% | —N/a | | 2018 | |
| San Marino | 292 | 479 | 292 | 100% | 0 | 0% | —N/a | | 2006 | |
| American Samoa | 241 | 121 | 0 | 0% | 241 | 100% | —N/a | | 2016 | |
| Niue | 234 | 90 | 0 | 0% | 234 | 100% | —N/a | | 2017 | |
| British Virgin Islands | 200 | 132 | 0 | 0% | 200 | 100% | —N/a | | 2007 | |
| Saint Helena | 198 | 162 | 0 | 0% | 198 | 100% | —N/a | | 2002 | |
| Anguilla | 175 | 192 | 82 | 47% | 93 | 53% | —N/a | | 2004 | |
| Christmas Island | 140 | 104 | 0 | 0% | 140 | 100% | —N/a | | 2011 | |
| Turks and Caicos Islands | 121 | 13 | 0 | 0% | 121 | 100% | —N/a | | 2003 | |
| Saint Pierre and Miquelon | 117 | 48 | 0 | 0% | 117 | 100% | —N/a | | 2009 | |
| Maldives | 93 | 31 | 0 | 0% | 93 | 100% | —N/a | | 2018 | |
| Norfolk Island | 80 | 222 | 0 | 0% | 80 | 100% | —N/a | | 2008 | |
| Monaco | 77 | 3,850 | 77 | 100% | 0 | 0% | 10 | 13.0% | 2019 | |
| Sint Maarten | 53 | 156 | 0 | 0% | 53 | 100% | —N/a | | | |
| Nauru | 30 | 143 | 24 | 80% | 6 | 20% | —N/a | | 2002 | |
| Gibraltar | 29 | 483 | 0 | 0% | 29 | 100% | —N/a | | 2007 | |
| Cocos (Keeling) Islands | 22 | 157 | 22 | 100% | 0 | 0% | —N/a | | 2007 | |
| Vatican City | 9 | 2,045 | 9 | 100% | 0 | 0% | 9 | 100.0% | 2003 | |
| Tuvalu | 8 | 31 | 0 | 0% | 8 | 100% | —N/a | | 2011 | |
