= A14 road (Botswana) =

Road in Botswana

A14 highway

Route information
- Length: 248 km (154 mi)

Major junctions
- From: A30 A30 in Orapa
- To: A1 A1 in Palapye

Location
- Country: Botswana
- Major cities: Orapa, Letlhakane, Mmashoro, Serowe, Palapye

Highway system
- Transport in Botswana
← A12	→ A15

The A14 is a side road of the A1 road and A30 road from Orapa Game Park to Palapye, bypassing Serowe, the seventh largest town in Botswana. It runs past Khama Rhino Sanctuary. It is 248 kilometres (154 mi) long.
