= A32 road (Botswana) =

Road in Botswana

A32 highway

Route information
- Length: 37.7 km (23.4 mi)

Major junctions
- From: A3 road (Botswana), 140 km (87 mi) from Francistown City Centre
- To: Sua Pan Airport, Sowa

Location
- Country: Botswana
- Major cities: Sowa

Highway system
- Transport in Botswana
← A31	→ A33

The A32 is the only road in Botswana to Sowa and Sua Pan Airport (also known as Sowa Airport). It is 37.7 kilometres (23.4 mi) long and is, essentially, a cul-de-sac.
