= SXN =

SXN or sxn may refer to:

- SXN, the IATA code for Sua Pan Airport, Sowa, Botswana
- sxn, the ISO 639-3 code for Sangir language, Indonesia and Philippines
