= A3 road (Botswana) =

Road in Botswana

A3 highway
- A3 route map

Route information
- Length: 816 km (507 mi)

Major junctions
- From: A1 in Francistown
- A30 near Francistown; A32 near Nata; A33 in Nata; A35 in Sehithwa
- To: A2 in Ghanzi

Location
- Country: Botswana
- Major cities: Francistown, Nata, Gweta, Maun, Ghanzi

Highway system
- Transport in Botswana
← A2	→ A10

The A3 highway in Botswana is an 816-kilometre-long (507 mi) road that runs from Francistown (where it is called Gemmel Drive) through Nata, Gweta and Maun to end at a junction with the A2 road just after Ghanzi.

== Route ==
The A3 begins in the Francistown city centre in the North-East District at a junction with the A1 road. It begins by heading westwards as Gemmel Drive to cross the Tati River and reach the Phillip Gaonwe Matante International Airport entrance before meeting the eastern terminus of the A30 road. It proceeds north-west for 180 kilometres, crossing into the Central District at Mathangwane, meeting the eastern terminus of the A32 road, bypassing the Nata Bird Sanctuary and crossing the Nata River, to reach the town of Nata, where it meets the southern terminus of the A33 road.

From Nata, the A3 continues westwards for 300 kilometres, through Zoroga and Gweta, crossing into the North-West District and passing in-between the Nxai Pan National Park and the Makgadikgadi Pans National Park, to reach the town of Maun (the tourist capital of Botswana), where it crosses the Thamalakane River into the Maun town centre before turning to the south-west.

From Maun, the A3 heads south-west for 280 kilometres, through Komana and Toteng, meeting the south-eastern terminus of the A35 road at Sehithwa (adjacent to Lake Ngami) and crossing into Ghanzi District, through Dekar, to reach the town of Ghanzi. It proceeds southwards for 45 kilometres to reach its end at a junction with the A2 road (Trans-Kalahari Corridor).

== See also ==
- Mathangwane Village
