= Ramatlabama =

- Location within North West (South African province) Location within South Africa Location within Africa
- Coordinates: 25°38′58″S 25°34′30″E
- Country: South Africa
- Province: North West
- District: Ngaka Modiri Molema
- Municipality: Mafikeng

Government
  - Type: Ward 3

Area
  - Total: 2.45 km^{2} (0.95 sq mi)

Population (2011)
  - Total: 2,046
  - Density: 835/km^{2} (2,160/sq mi)

Racial makeup (2011)
  - Black African: 98.1%
  - Coloured: 1.1%
  - Indian/Asian: 0.6%
  - White: 0.2%

First languages (2011)
  - Tswana: 85.1%
  - Xhosa: 4.8%
  - Zulu: 3.3%
  - English: 1.7%
  - Other: 5.1%
- Time zone: UTC+2 (SAST)
- Postal code (street): 2745
- PO box: 2745

Ramatlabama (or Ramatlhabama) is a village and railway station 25 kilometres (16 mi) north of Mafikeng, in the North West province of South Africa. It is located on the border with Botswana, and serves as a border post for road and rail traffic. At the time of the 2011 census, Ramatlabama along with the adjoining settlement of Miga had a total population of 2,046. The Botswana side of the border is also known as Ramatlabama.

== Transport ==
Ramatlabama is the southern end of Botswana's A1 highway and the northern end of South Africa's N18. It is also the location where the Cape Town–Bulawayo railway line enters Botswana; north of Ramatlabama the railway is the main line of Botswana Railways, while to the south it is part of the network of Transnet Freight Rail.
