= Artisia =

- Location in Botswana
- Coordinates: 24°1′1″S 26°18′57″E
- Country: Botswana
- District: Kgatleng District

Population (2012)
  - Total: 1,871
- Time zone: +2

Artisia, also known as Mosomane or Artesia, is a village in Kgatleng District of Botswana. It is located around 55 km north of Mochudi, along the Gaborone-Mahalapye road (A1 road). The population was 3,330 in the 2022 census.
