= Dinokwe =

Town in Central District, Botswana

Coordinates: 23°26′S 26°41′E

Dinokwe (Palla Road) is a village located in the Central District of Botswana. The town has about 1,200 inhabitants (2001 census) and is situated along the main road known as the A1 road between the capital Gaborone and the second largest city Francistown. Dinokwe has a cattle railway station. Before the construction of North side carrier project, it was supplying Mahalapye (population 43.289 - (2011)) with water.

Palla Road, situated in the heart of the Bangwato territory, on the edge of the Kalahari Desert it is quite dry and the local waterways are dry, except during the rainy season is transformed into a verdant haven. The landscape bursts forth with lush greenery, as towering trees stretch towards the sky and wildflowers bloom in every direction. The air is filled with the sweet fragrance of acacia trees in blossom and the gentle rustle of leaves, to date some traditionalists continue to forage for wild plants, utilising their medicinal properties to create potent remedies and herbal infusions. For generations, the Bangwato people have relied on the natural world to provide for their health and wellbeing and some of these herbs can even be used on cattle and other animals. With a deep understanding of the plants and their properties, they carefully gather and prepare the wild herbs, passing down their knowledge through oral tradition.

In recent times, the largest coal reserves in Southern Africa has been found approximately 15 km from Dinokwe.

In the heart of Palla Road village where the sun is dipped in to the horizon and painted the sky with hues of crimson and gold, we find three (3) village wards, each ward is headed by a Herdman. There is a main Kgotla where there is the village chief, policemen, court bailiff and court clerk. The village has a Health Post, a Post Office as well as a Primary school. There are other government service personnel like the Technical Officer - Crops as well as Technical Officers Veterinary Service, The village development is overseen by a group of selected personnels forming an organization called Village Development Community (VDC).

ECONOMIC ACTIVITIES Most people in Palla Road are farmers (keeping animals as well as growing crops). People also harvest and collect natural grass for both usage and selling. Thatch grass selling is a very popular activity that is undertaken by most families. The villagers also collect, dry and sell wild berries.
