= A1 road (Botswana) =

Road in Botswana

Coordinates: 20.588318°S 27.643726°E

A1 highway
- A1 route map
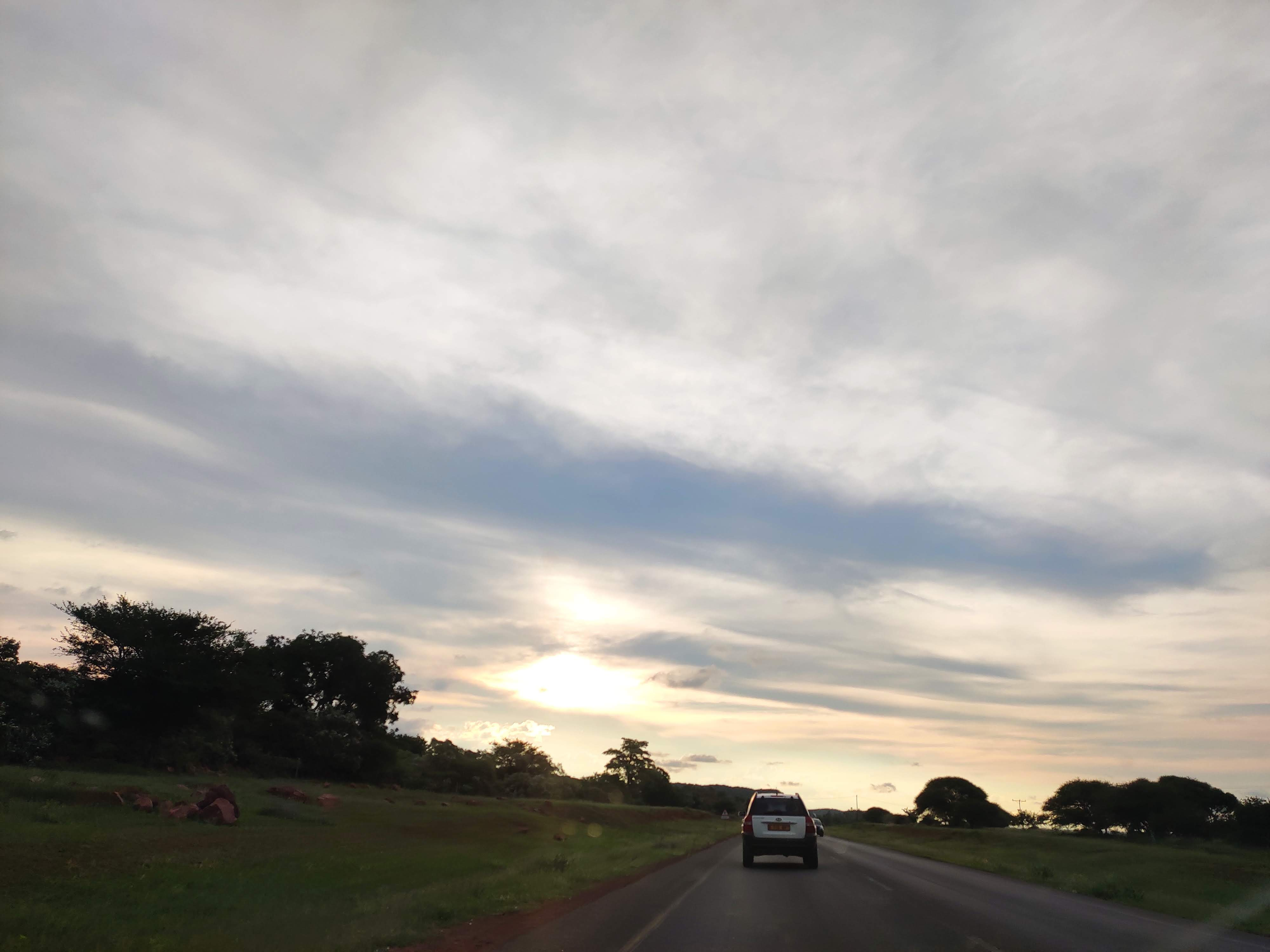

Route information
- Length: 638 km (396 mi)

Major junctions
- North end: A7 A7 near the Ramokgwebana border with Zimbabwe
- A3 in Francistown; A14 in Palapye; A12 in Gaborone; A10 in Gaborone; A2 in Lobatse
- South end: N18 at the Ramatlabama border with South Africa

Location
- Country: Botswana
- Major cities: Lobatse, Palapye, Mahalapye, Francistown, Gaborone

Highway system
- Transport in Botswana
→ A2

The A1 highway in Botswana is a road that runs from the Zimbabwean border near Ramokgwebana through Francistown, Palapye, Mahalapye, Gaborone (the national capital city) and Lobatse, to Ramatlabama at the border with South Africa.

Decisions were made to install a toll point along that road in 2007.

A section of the highway between Phakalane and Gaborone is used for the Gaborone City Marathon.

The entire A1 road is part of Trans-African Highway Network no. 4 (Cairo-Cape Town Highway), which links Cairo with Cape Town.

== Route ==
The A1 begins at the Ramokgwebana border with Zimbabwe, where the Ramokgwebana River forms the boundary. On the Zimbabwean side, the border is named Plumtree and the road is the A7 road. The A1 begins by heading southwards from Ramokgwebana for 82 kilometres to pass through the city of Francistown, where it passes through the city centre and meets the eastern terminus of the A3 road (which connects to the Phillip Gaonwe Matante International Airport and to Nata) before crossing the Tati River.

From Francistown, the A1 heads southwards for 163 kilometres, crossing the Shashe River near the Shashe Dam, through Tonota and Serule, to reach the town of Palapye, where it meets the south-eastern terminus of the A14 road and a road (B140) connecting south-east to the Grobler's Bridge (Martin's Drift) border with the Limpopo Province of South Africa.

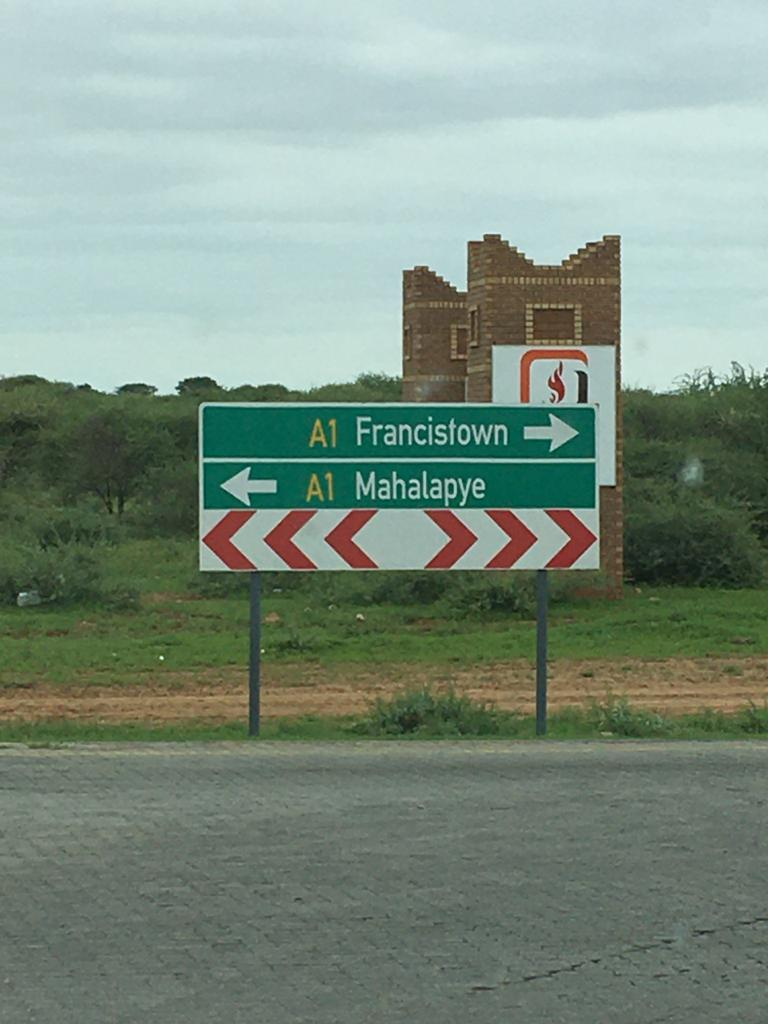
A road sign on A1

From Palapye, the A1 continues southwards for 72 kilometres to the town of Mahalapye before proceeding another 200 kilometres, through Dinokwe, Mosomane and Rasesa, to enter the city of Gaborone (capital of Botswana) near the Sir Seretse Khama International Airport.

In Gaborone, the A1 passes to the west of the central business district (where it meets the south-eastern terminus of the A12 road and the north-eastern terminus of the A10 road) before bypassing the Gaborone Dam and the Kgale Hill and leaving the city south-westwards.

The A1 continues south-south-west for 70 kilometres, bypassing Ramotswa and Mogobane, to pass through the town of Lobatse and reach a junction with the A2 road (Trans-Kalahari Corridor) west of the Skilpadshek (Pioneer Gate) border with South Africa. It continues southwards for another 46 kilometres to reach the Ramatlabama border with South Africa, where it becomes the N18 road on the South African side and connects to Mahikeng.
