= Sua Pan Airport =

Airport in Sua Pan, Botswana

Sua Pan Airport Sowa Airport
- IATA: SXN; ICAO: FBSN

Summary
- Airport type: Private
- Serves: Sowa, Botswana
- Location: Sua Pan
- Elevation AMSL: 2,985 ft (910 m)
- Coordinates: 20°33′12″S 26°06′55″E

Map
- Location of airport in Botswana

Runways
| Direction | Length | | Surface |
| Direction | m | ft | Surface |
|---|---|---|---|
| 11/29 | 1,675 | 5,495 | Asphalt |
- Source: WAD GCM Google Maps

Sua Pan Airport or Sowa Airport (IATA: SXN, ICAO: FBSN) is an airport 11 kilometres (6.8 mi) west of Sowa, a town in the Central District of Botswana.

The runway is between the north and south basins of the Sua Pan (also known as Sowa Pan), a salt pan where sodium carbonate (soda ash) is mined. Sowa means salt in the language of the San.

== See also ==
- Transport in Botswana
- List of airports in Botswana
