= A35 road (Botswana) =

Road in Botswana

A35 highway

Route information
- Length: 296 km (184 mi)

Major junctions
- From: C48 at Mohembo Border Control, border with Namibia
- To: A3 at Sehithwa, Lake Ngami

Location
- Country: Botswana
- Major cities: Mohembo, Shakawe, Gumare, Nokaneng, Tsau, Sehithwa

Highway system
- Transport in Botswana

The A35 is a 296-kilometre-long (184 mi) road linking Namibia to Sehithwa and then onto the A3 road to access Francistown. The route is notable for the amount of airports on the road.

Portions of the road are in poor condition, and under construction. As of 2026, work was ongoing but parts of the road remain impassible during rainy conditions.

== Airports ==
- Shakawe Airport
- Etsha Airport
- Nxamaseri Airport
- Gumare Airport
- Nokaneng Airport
- Tsau Airport
