= A11 road (Botswana) =

Road in Botswana

A11 highway

Major junctions
- From: Off the A10 road near Thamaga
- To: Ramotswa border with South Africa

Location
- Country: Botswana
- Major cities: Mmankgodi, Ramotswa

Highway system
- Transport in Botswana
← A10	→ A12

The A11 is a planned road in Botswana; it currently runs as the B111.
