= A10 road (Botswana) =

Road in Botswana

A10 highway
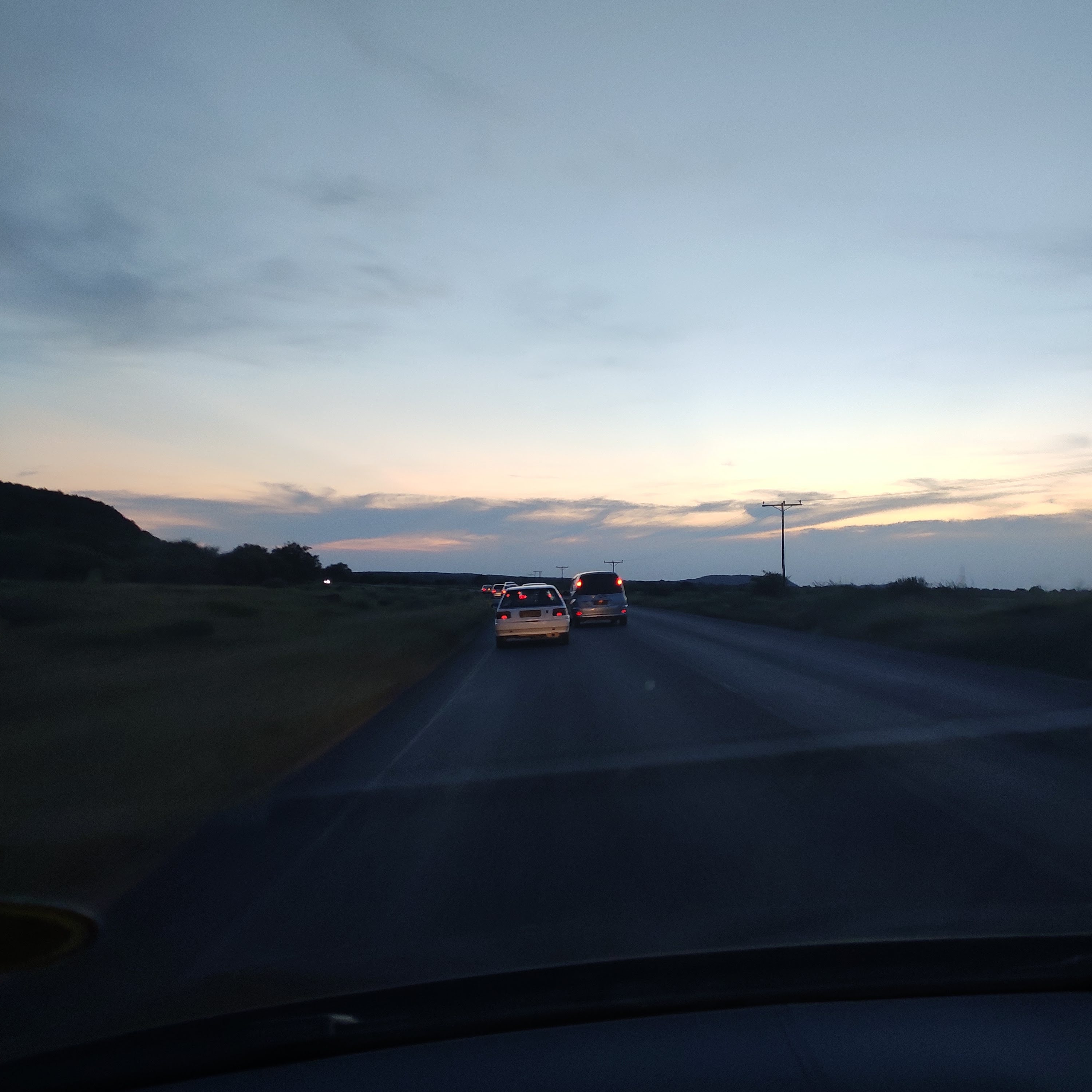

Route information
- Length: 80.4 km (50.0 mi)

Major junctions
- From: A2 A2 near Kanye
- To: A1 A1 in Gaborone

Location
- Country: Botswana
- Major cities: Kanye, Moshupa, Thamaga, Gaborone

Highway system
- Transport in Botswana
← A3	→ A11

The A10 is a side road of the A1 road and A2 road. It connects Kanye to Gaborone, the capital of Botswana. It is 80.4 kilometres (50.0 mi) long.

In 2024, the section from Mogoditshane to Mmankgodi was set to be upgraded to a dual carriageway. In 2025, work was delayed while utility relocation and land expropriation issues were dealt with.
