= A2 road (Botswana) =

Road in Botswana

A2 highway
- Trans-Kalahari Corridor
- A2 route map

Route information
- Length: 762 km (473 mi)

Major junctions
- West end: B6 at Buitepos, Namibian border
- A3 near Ghanzi; A20 in Sekoma; A10 at Kanye; A1 near Lobatse
- East end: N4 at Pioneer Gate, South African border

Location
- Country: Botswana
- Towns: Kang, Jwaneng, Kanye, Lobatse

Highway system
- Transport in Botswana
← A1	→ A3

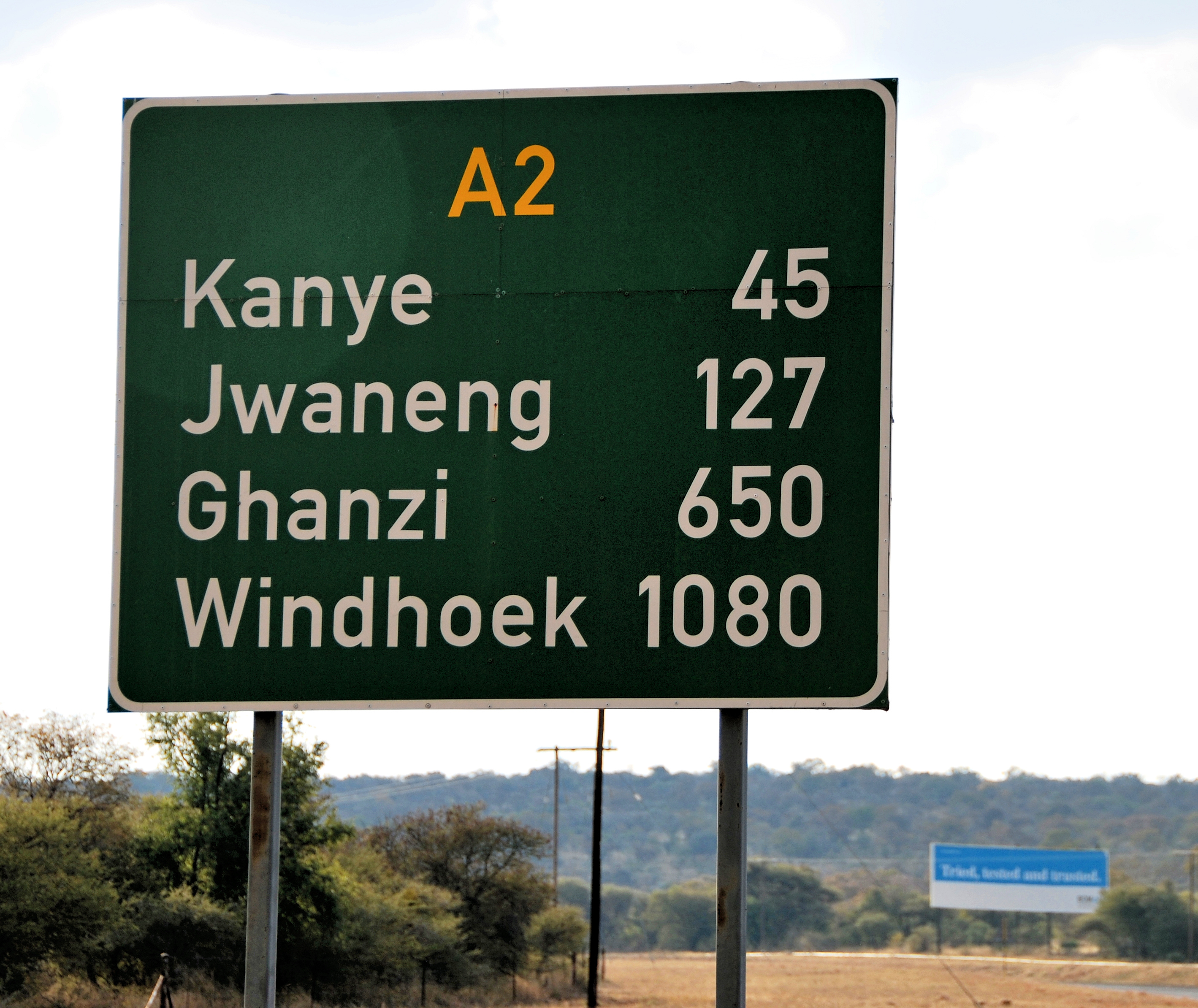
A2 Road Sign in Botswana

The A2 highway is a road in Botswana running from the Namibian border at Buitepos through Jwaneng, Kanye and Lobatse to the South African border at Pioneer Gate, thus connecting 3 countries.

The A2 is a major component of the Trans-Kalahari Corridor, which is a highway corridor that provides a direct route from Pretoria to central Namibia, in particular to Windhoek and the port of Walvis Bay. There are potholes scattered around the road, causing immediate danger.

== Route ==
The A2 begins at the Buitepos border with Namibia, where it is designated as the B6 road on the Namibian side towards Gobabis and Windhoek. It begins by heading eastwards for 165 kilometres to meet the south-western terminus of the A3 road about 45 kilometres south-west of Ghanzi in the Ghanzi District.

The A2 turns to the south-east and heads for 380 kilometres, through Kang, to enter Sekoma, where it meets the north-eastern terminus of the A20 road. It continues east-south-east for 157 kilometres, through Jwaneng, to enter the town of Kanye, where it meets the south-western terminus of the A10 road. It continues south-east for 50 kilometres to reach a junction with the A1 road just south of Lobatse. It continues eastwards for 11 kilometres to reach its end at the Pioneer Gate border with South Africa, where it becomes the N4 road (Platinum Highway) on the South African side towards Zeerust. The border on the South African side is called Skilpadshek.

== Incidents ==
On 29 April 2024, 7 South African nationals died in a crash while driving on this road.
