= Mmashoro =

Village in Botswana

Coordinates: 21°52′3″S 26°26′21″E

Location of Mmashoro

Mmashoro is a village in Central District of Botswana. It is located 80 km north-west of Serowe. and the population was 1,543 in 2001 census. Mmashoro People did their shopping at serowe village.
