= A33 road (Botswana) =

Road in Botswana

A33 highway

Route information
- Length: 363 km (226 mi)

Major junctions
- North end: B8 at Ngoma Bridge, border with Namibia
- M19 (Kazungula Bridge) at Kazungula, border with Zambia
- South end: A3 at Nata

Location
- Country: Botswana
- Major cities: Kasane, Nata

Highway system
- Transport in Botswana
← A32	→ A35

The A33 is a 363-kilometre-long (226 mi) road in Botswana that connects the Caprivi Strip of Namibia as well as Zambia with Nata via Kazungula. It is an important route used by motorists from Zambia and the Caprivi Strip to access the towns of Botswana.

== Route ==
The A33 begins at the Ngoma border with Namibia on the Chobe River, with the town of Ngoma in the Caprivi Strip on the other side of the river. The road on the Namibian side is designated as the B8 road. The A33 begins by heading eastwards for 65 kilometres, through the northern part of the Chobe National Park, following the Chobe River, to pass by the Kasane Airport and the town of Kasane before reaching the border settlement of Kazungula (just south of the Chobe River's confluence with the Zambezi River). Here, it reaches a junction, where the road northwards proceeds to Zambia via the Kazungula Bridge (crossing the Zambezi River and becoming the M19 road on the other side of the border) (the border town on the Zambian side is also called Kazungula) and the road eastwards proceeds to Zimbabwe (to Victoria Falls) (the border post settlement with Zimbabwe is also called Kazungula).

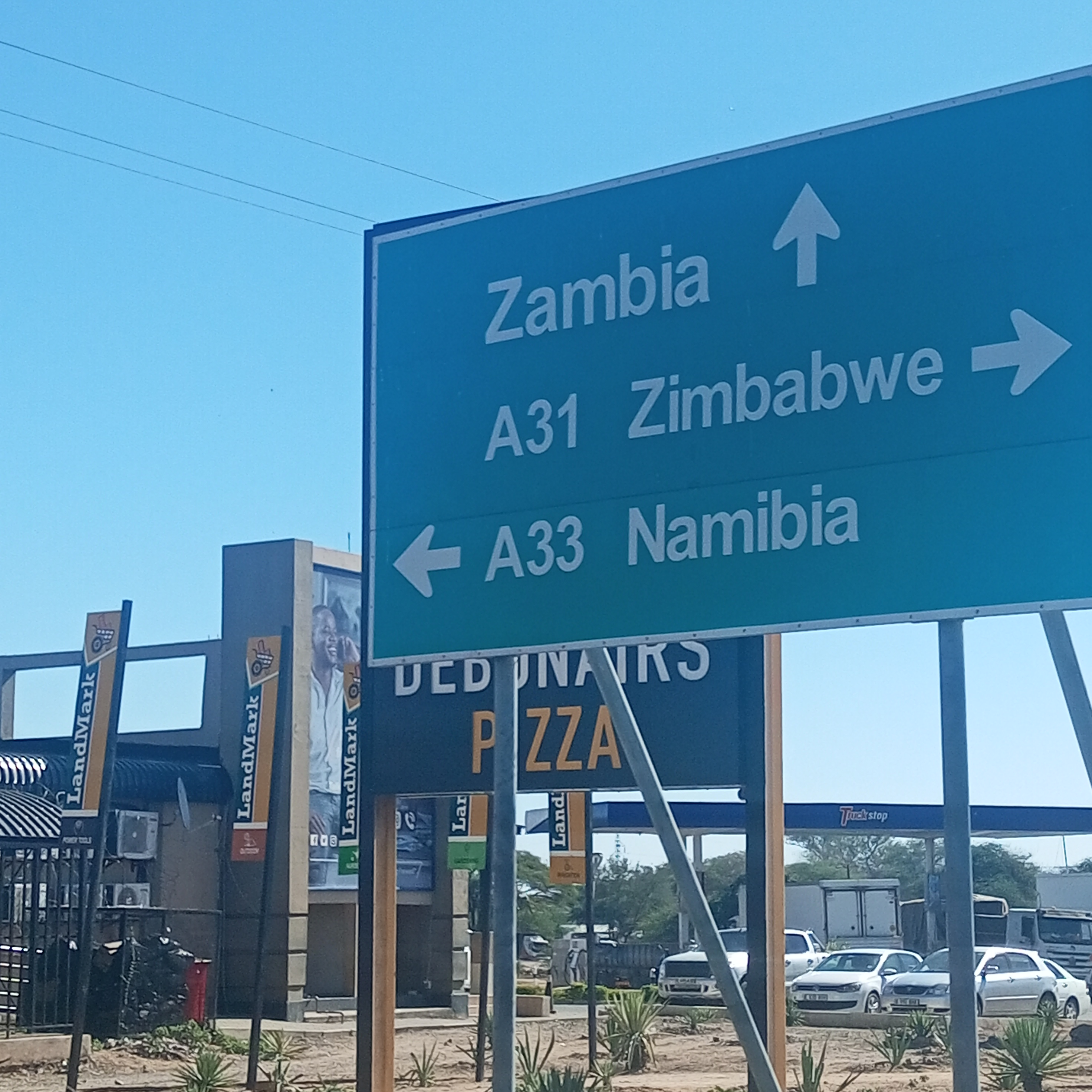
A road sign on the A33 in Kazungula

At Kazungula, the A33 turns to the south and proceeds for 300 kilometres, following the borderline with Zimbabwe, through Lesoma and Pandamatenga, crossing into the Central District and passing through Matlamanyane, to reach its end at a junction with the A3 road in the town of Nata.
