= Sehithwa =

Coordinates: 20°28′S 22°43′E

Location of Sehithwa

Sehithwa is a village in North-West District of Botswana. It is located in the southern part of the district, close to Lake Ngami. The population was 1,478 in 2001 census.
