= Sowa, Botswana =

Coordinates: 20°33′49″S 026°13′28″E

Sowa
- Town
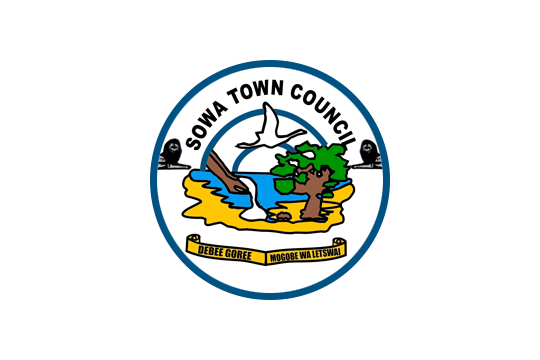
- Flag

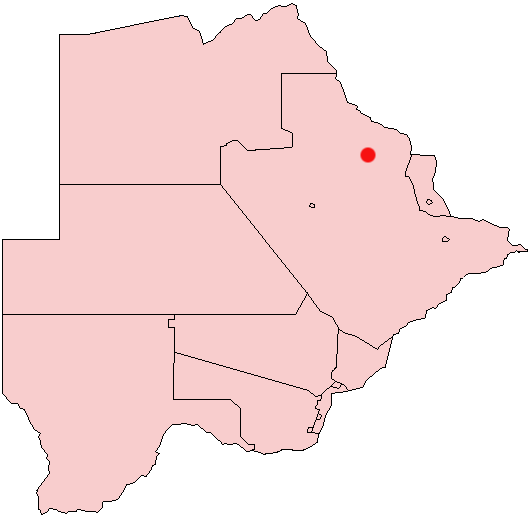
- Sowa, Botswana
- Country: Botswana

Population (2022)
  - Total: 2,914
- Time zone: UTC+2 (Central Africa Time)
  - Summer (DST): UTC+2 (not observed)

Sowa is a town which lies in the Central District of Botswana, but constitutes a separate administrative district. The Sowa Township was established in 1991 by an act of Parliament, Statutory Instrument No. 26 of 1991 and governed by Sowa Township Regulations, 1991 under the Township Act (Cap 40:02). The population was 2,879 inhabitants, according to 2001 Census, and 3,598, according to the 2011 census.

Sowa means salt in the language of the San. The town is located near the Sua Pan (also known as Sowa Pan), a salt pan where sodium carbonate (soda ash) is mined.
