= A30 road (Botswana) =

Road in Botswana

A30 highway

Route information
- Length: 470 km (290 mi)

Major junctions
- From: Francistown, 4 km from city centre
- To: Motopi outskirts where it joins back with the A3 road

Location
- Country: Botswana
- Major cities: Francistown, Orapa, Rakops or Tsienyane, Motopi

Highway system
- Transport in Botswana
← A20	→ A31

The A30 is a highway in Botswana that departs from the A3 road a few kilometers from Francistown, swoops around the Makgadikgadi Pans and joins the A3 again on the outskirts of Motopi. The A30 near Francistown is considered particularly dangerous for drivers, especially around holidays.
