= Transport in Botswana =

Transportation in Botswana is provided by an extensive network of railways, highways, ferry services and air routes that criss-cross the country. The transport sector in Botswana played an important role in economic growth following its independence in 1966. The country discovered natural resources which allowed it to finance the development of infrastructure, and policy ensured that the transport sector grew at an affordable pace commensurate with demands for services.

== Rail transport ==
Rail services are provided by Botswana Railways, with most routes radiating from Gaborone. Botswana has the 93rd longest railway network in the world at 888 km, it is one of the busiest railways in Africa. The track gauge is 1,067 mm (3 ft 6 in) (cape gauge). Botswana is an associate member of the International Union of Railways (UIC).

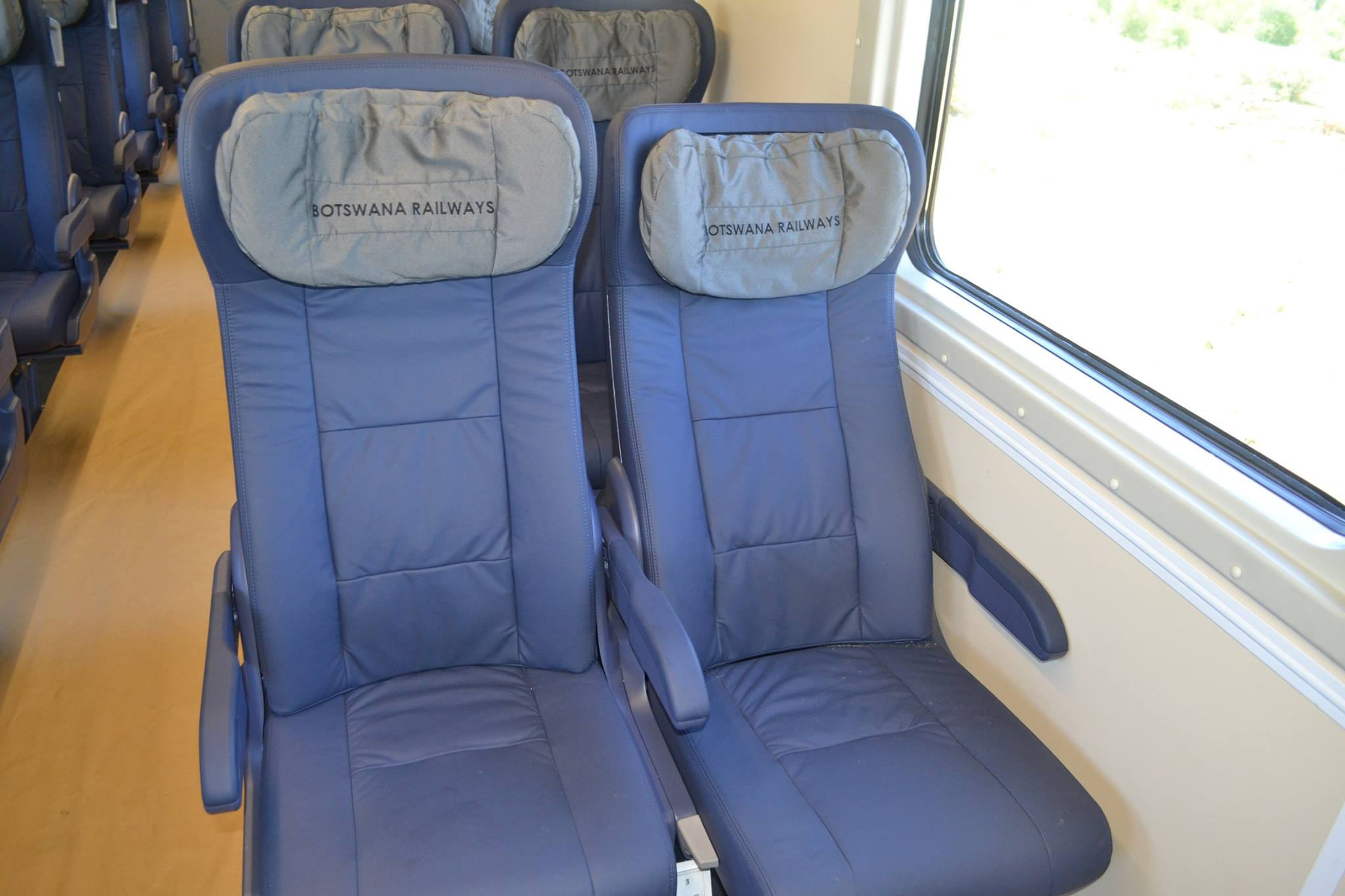
The new chairs of BR Express

=== Regional trains (BR Express) ===
Botswana Railways run 2 nightly passenger trains, one from Lobatse to Francistown, and the other from Francistown to Lobatse, with stops in Gaborone, Mahalapye, Palapye, and Serule. The passenger train is termed the "BR Express" (Botswana Railways). Passenger services were suspended from 2009 to 2016, with the exception of an international link to Zimbabwe from Francistown.

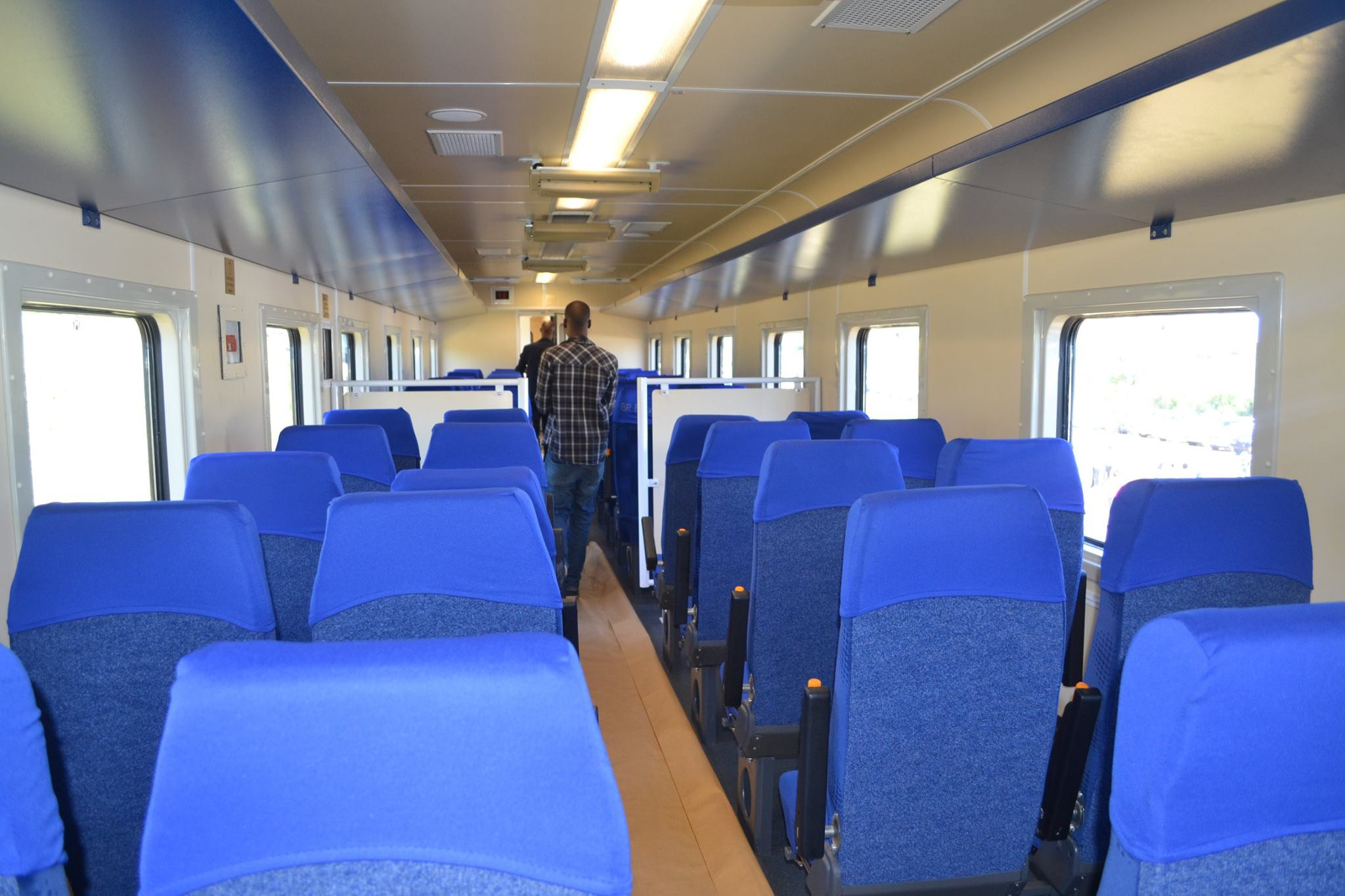

=== Commuter/suburban trains ===
In Botswana, the (Botswana Railways) "BR Express" has a commuter train between Lobatse and Gaborone. The train departs to Lobatse at 0530hrs and arrives at Gaborone at 0649hrs. This train returns to Lobatse in the evening, departing in Gaborone at 1800hrs. Arrival time at Lobatse is 1934hrs. The train stops at Otse, Ramotswa, and Commerce Park Halt.

=== BR Express Sleeping & Dining Department ===
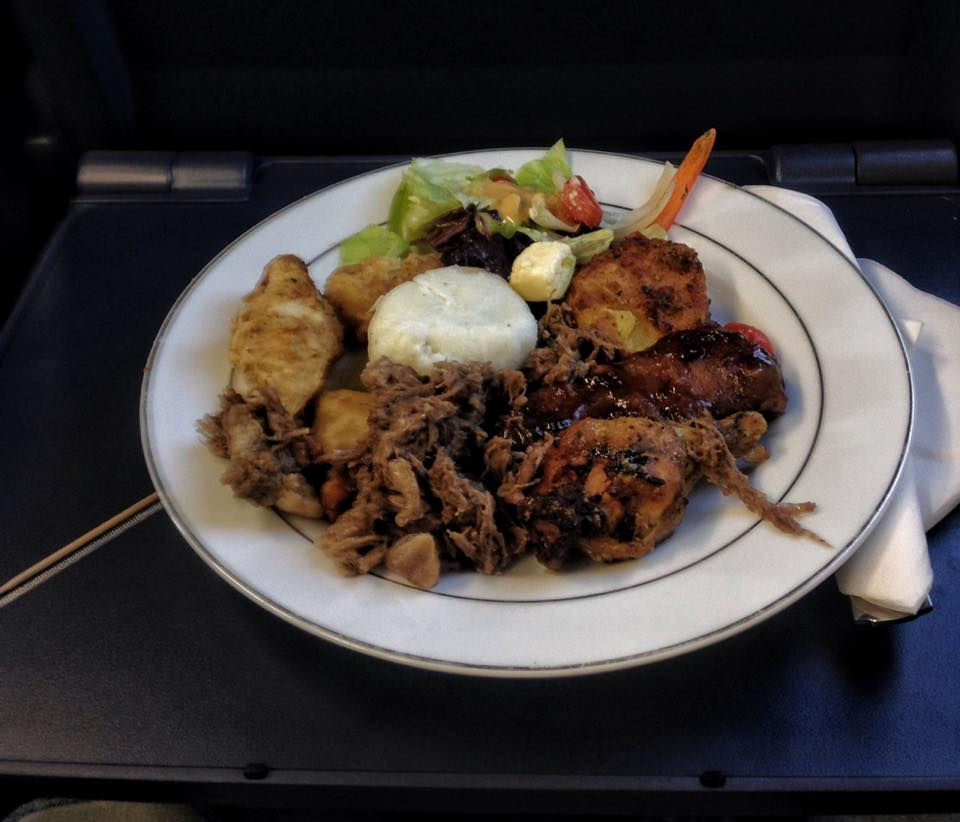
BR Express Dining Department

From the beginning, the BR decided to operate its own sleeping cars, thus building bigger-sized berths and more comfortable surroundings. Providing and operating their cars allowed better control of the services and revenue. While the food was served to passengers, the profits were never result of serving the food. Those who could afford to travel great distances expected better facilities, and favorable opinions from the overall experience would attract others to Botswana and the BR's trains.

=== Freight trains ===
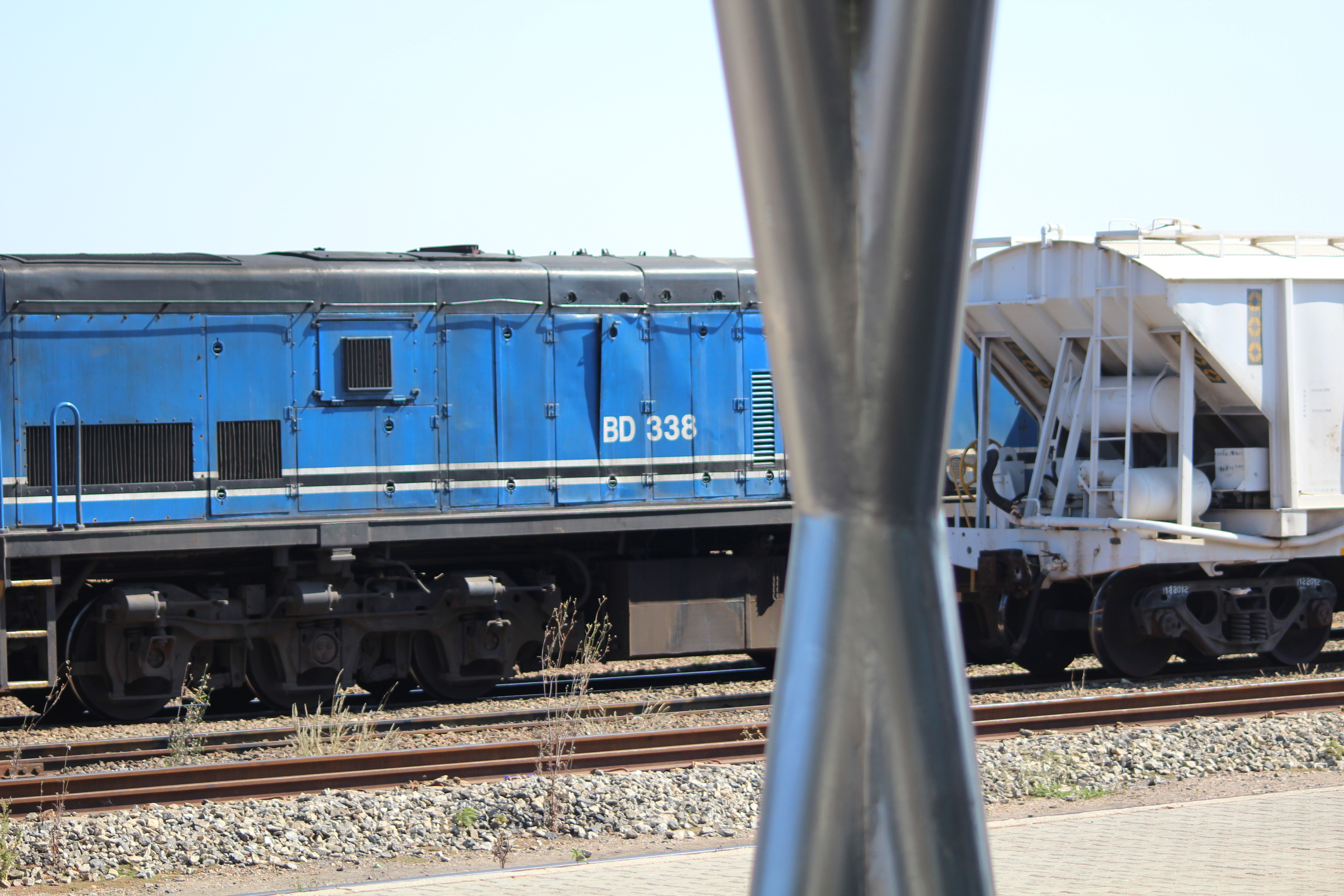
Freight Train of Botswana

Over half of BRs freight traffic is in coal, grain and intermodal freight, and it also ships automotive parts and assembled automobiles, sulphur, fertilizers, other chemicals, soda ash, forest products and other types of the commodities.

=== Locomotives ===
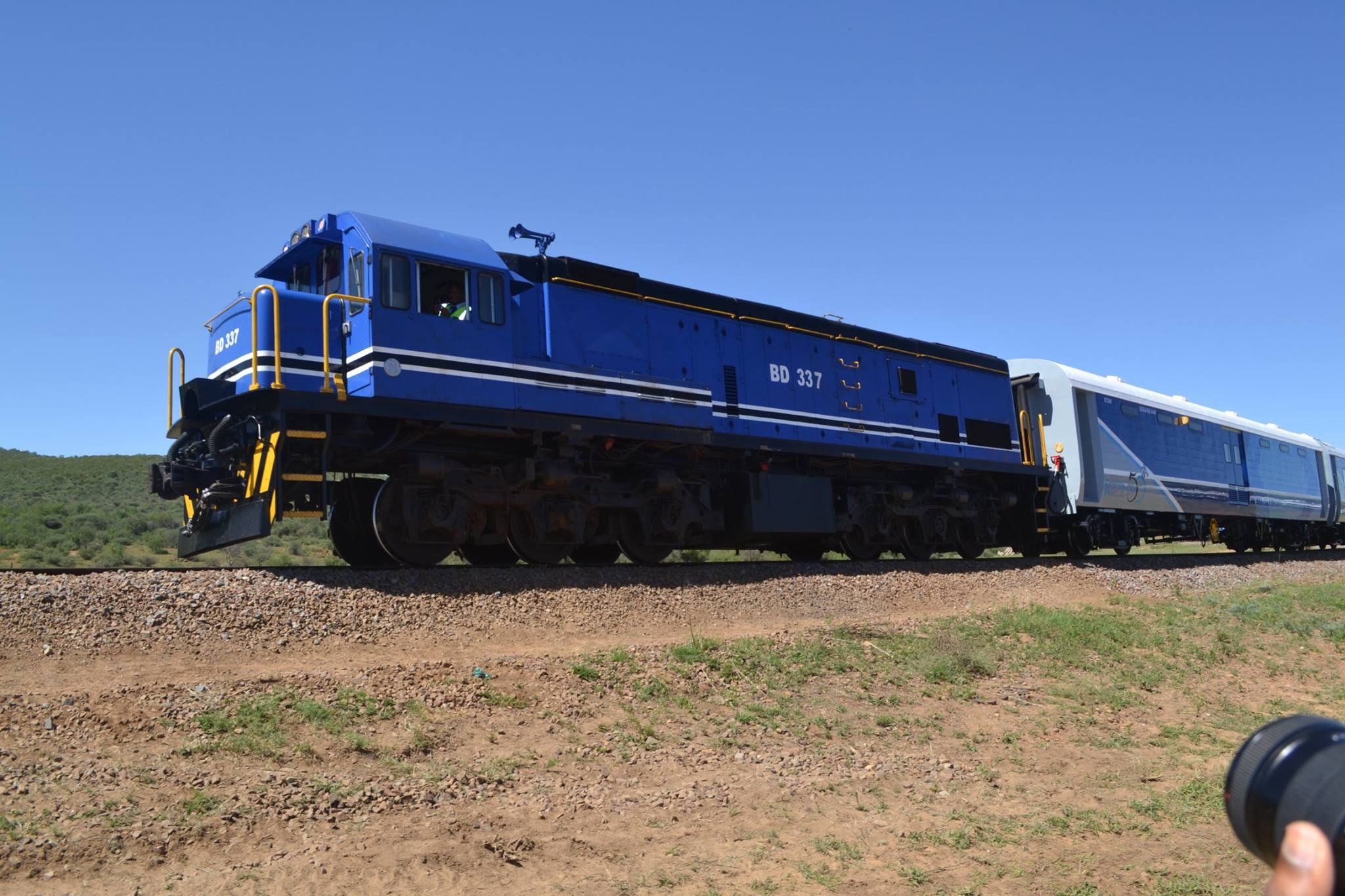
BR Express Train from Gaborone to Francistown

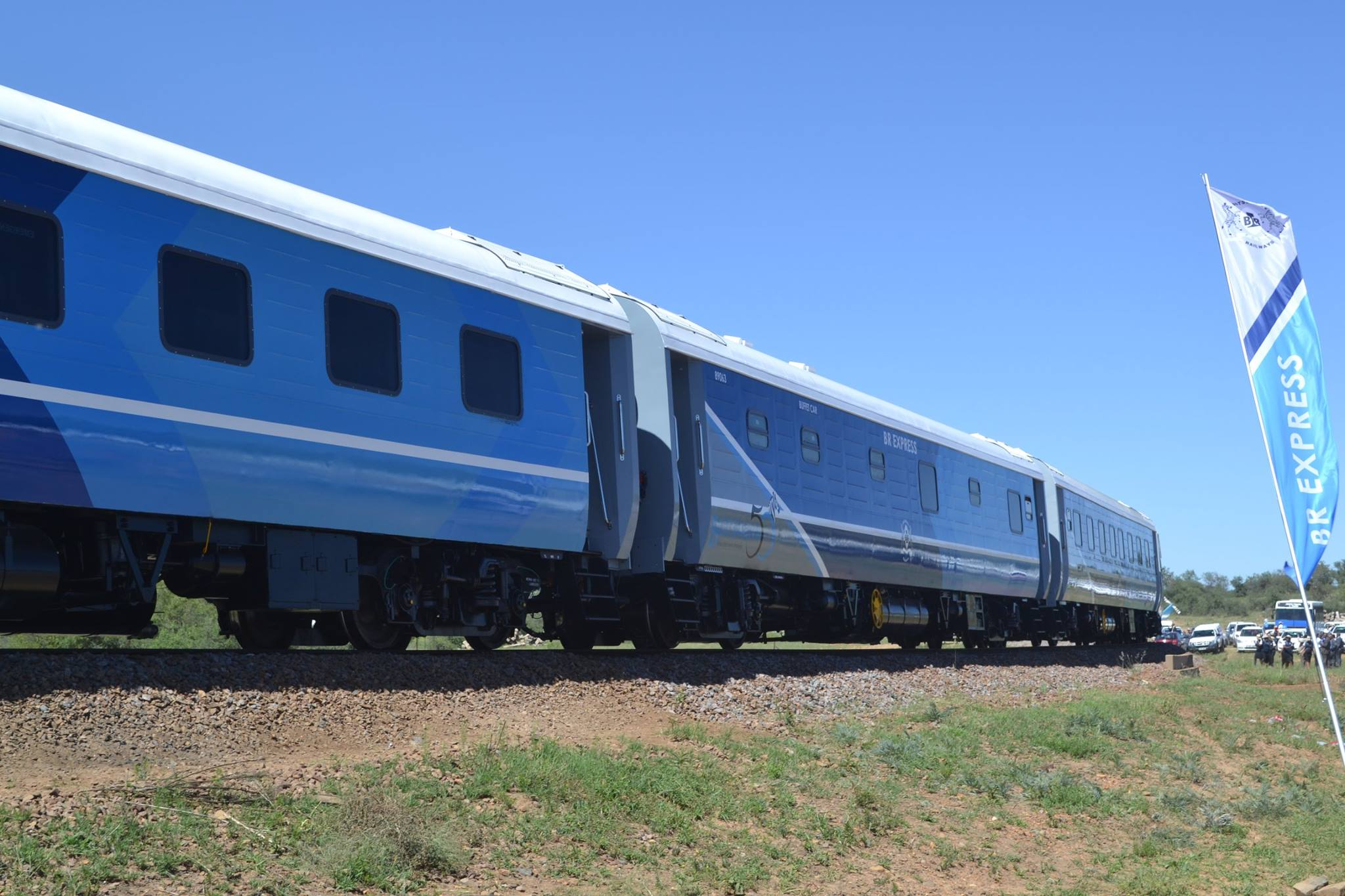

Diesel locomotives

As of March 2009:

- 8 General Electric UM 22C diesel-electric locomotive, 1982.
- 20 General Motors Model GT22LC-2 diesel-electric locomotive, 1986.
- 10 General Electric UI5C diesel-electric locomotive, 1990.
- 8 new gt142aces were delivered in the end of 2017.

=== Network ===
Botswana rail network

- total: 888 km (since 2023).
- number of stations: 13.
- standard gauge: 1,067 mm (3 ft 6 in) cape gauge.

=== Railway links with adjacent countries ===
Existing

- South Africa (same gauge)
- Zimbabwe (same gauge)

==== Currently under construction ====
- Zambia - being built at Kazungula Bridge in Kazungula.

==== Proposed ====
- Namibia
- Mozambique

== Road transport ==
=== Vehicle population ===
- Botswana had 584,000 locally registered vehicles at the end of June 2019 - more than double the number compared to 10 years prior. This equates to around 250 vehicles per 1,000 people in the country.
- 30,583 vehicles were registered in the first 6 months of 2019.
- Secondhand imports from Asia and the UK are a significant source of vehicles in Botswana.

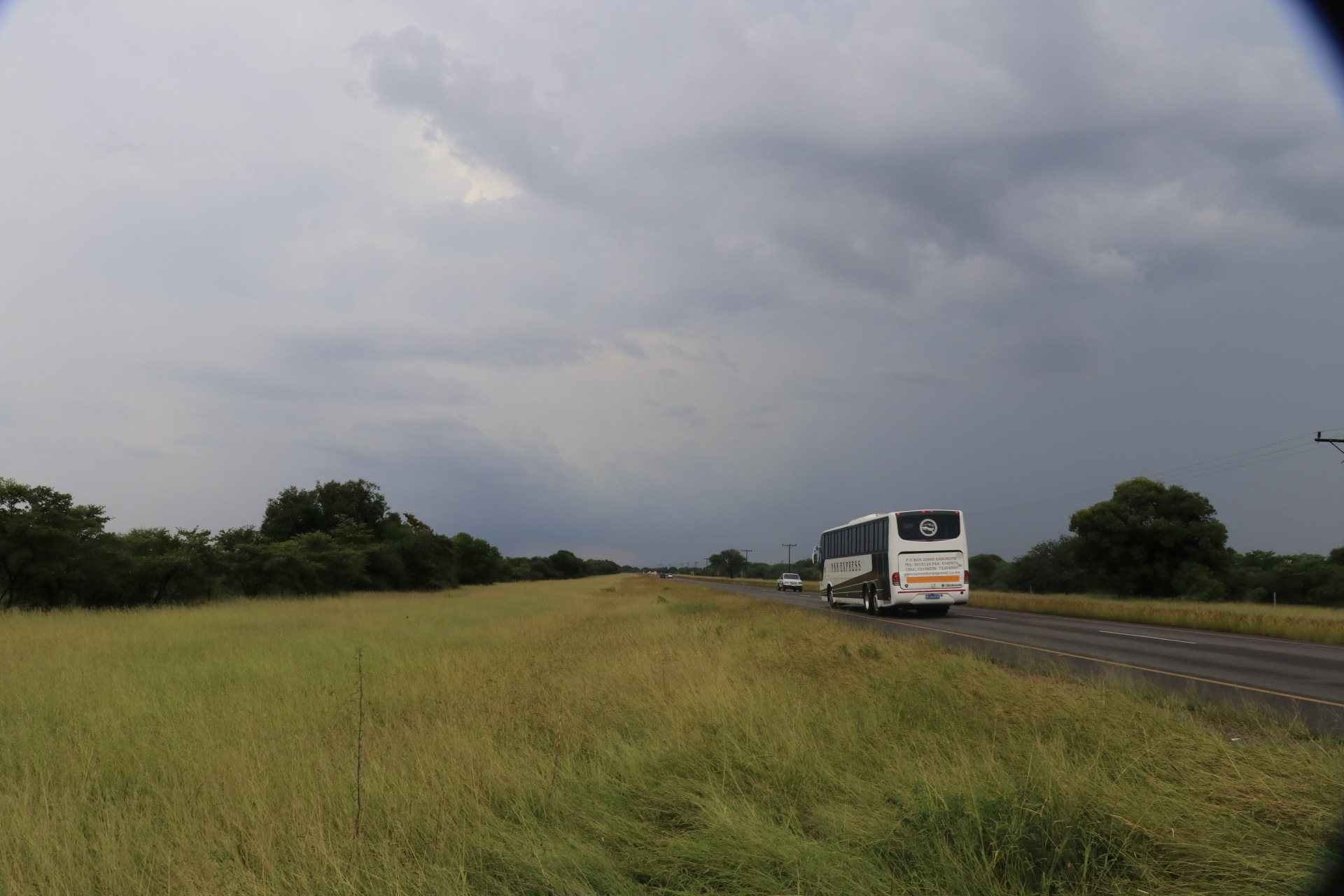
Bus on the A1l

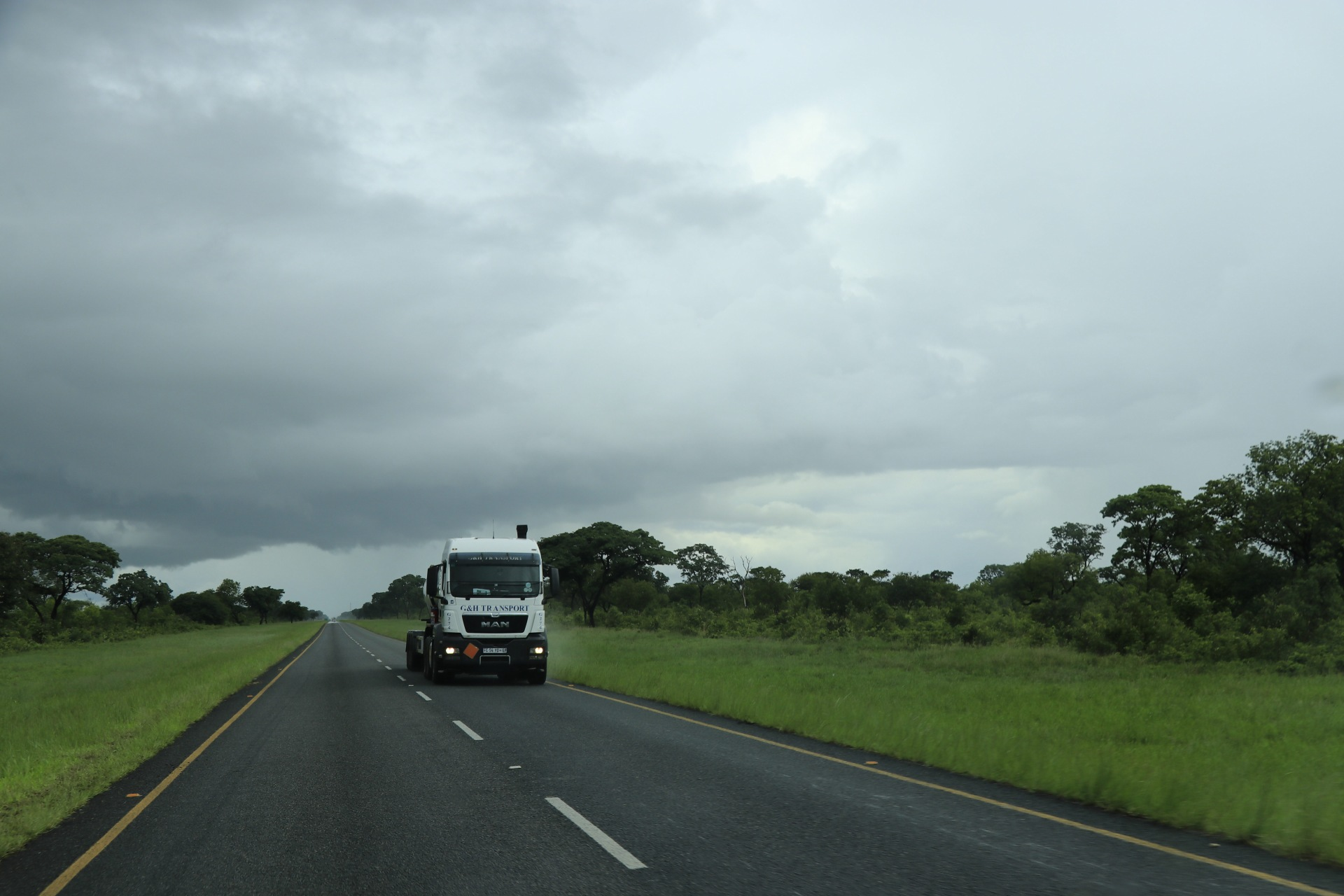
Cargo Trucking o the A3

=== A-roads ===
A-roads are highways and other major roads.

Road	Connections
A1	Zimbabwe (A7) - Ramokgwebane (B315) - Tshesebe (B311) - Francistown (A3, B162) - Dikabeya (B151) - Serule (A15) - Palapye (A14, B140) - Mahalapye (B145, B147) - Pilane (B130) - Gaborone (A10, A12) - Ramotswa (A11, B111) - Otse (B105) - Lobatse (A2) - Ramatlabama (B202) - South Africa (R503)
A2	Namibia (B6) - Charleshill (B214) - A3 (south of Ghanzi) - Morwamosu (B102) - Sekoma (A20) - Kanye (A10, B105, B202) - Lobatse (A1) - South Africa (N4)
A3	A2 - Ghanzi - Sehithwa (A35) - Maun (B334) - Matopi (B300) - Nata (A33) - Dukwe (A32) - Sebina (A31) - Francistown (A30, A1)
A10	Gaborone (A1, A12) - Thamaga (B111) - Mosopa - Kanye (A2, B105, B202)
A11	A1 - Ramotswa
A12	Molepolole (B102, B111, B112) - Metsimotlhaba (B122) - Gaborone (A1) - South Africa (R49)
A14	Orapa (A30, B300) - Serowe (B145) - Palapye (A1, B140)
A15	Serule (A1) - Selebi Phikwe (B157, B150)
A20	Sekoma (A2) - Khakhea (B205) - Tshabong (B210, B211)
A30	Orapa (A14, B300) - Francistown (A3)
A31	Tutume - Sebina (A3)
A32	Sowa - Dukwe (A3)
A33	Namibia (B6) - Muchenje - Kasane - Pandamatenga (B333) - Nata (A3)
A35	Namibia - Shakawe - Sehithwa (A3)

=== B-roads ===
B-roads are smaller distributor roads.

Road	Connections
B102	Morwamosu (A2) - Molepolole (A12, B111, B112)
B105	Kanye (A2, A10, B202) - Otse (A1)
B111	Molepolole (A12, B102, B112) - Thamaga (A10) - Ramotswa (A1, A11)
B112	Shoshong (B145) - Molepolole (A12, B102, B111)
B122	Lentsweletau (B123) - Metsimotlhaba (A12)
B123	Lentsweletau (B122) - east
B130	Pilane (A1) - Mochudi - Sikwane (B135) - South Africa
B135	Malolwane - Sikwane (B130)
B140	Palapye (A1, A14) - Sherwood (B141) - South Africa (Grobler's Bridge, N11)
B141	Machaneng (B147, B148) - Sherwood (B140)
B145	Serowe (A14) - Shoshong (B112) - Mahalapye (A1, B147)
B147	Mahalapye (A1, B145) - Machaneng (B141, B148)
B148	B140 - Machaneng (B141, B147)
B150	Selebi Phikwe (A15) - Sefophe (B150) - Tsetsebjwe
B151	Dikabeya (A1) - Sefophe (B151) - Bobonong (B155) - Kobojango
B155	Bobonong (B150) - Molalatau
B157	Mmadinare - Selebi Phikwe (A15)
B162	Francistown (A1, A3) - Matsiloje
B202	Kanye (A2, A10, B105) - Ramatlabama (A1)
B205	A2 - Khakhea (A20) - south
B210	Tshabong (A20, B211) - South Africa (R380)
B211	South Africa - Bokspits - Tshabong (A20, B210)
B214	Charleshill (A2) - Ncojane
B300	Matopi (A3) - Rakops - Orapa (A14, A30)
B311	Masunga (B316) - Tshesebe (A1)
B315	Zwenshambe (B316) - Moroka - Ramokgwebane (A1)
B316	Zwenshambe (B315) - Masunga (B311)
B333	A33 - Pandamatenga - Zimbabwe
B334	Shorobe - Maun (A3)

=== Motorways ===
Motorways in Botswana have a set of restrictions, which prohibit certain traffic from using the road. The following classes of traffic are not allowed on Botswana motorways:

- Learner drivers
- Slow vehicles (i.e., not capable of reaching 60 km/h on a level road)
- Invalid carriages (lightweight three-wheeled vehicles)
- Pedestrians
- Pedal-cycles (bicycles, etc.)
- Vehicles under 50cc (e.g. mopeds)
- Tractors
- Animals

Rules for driving on motorways include the following:

- The keep-left rule applies unless overtaking
- No stopping at any time
- No reversing
- No hitchhiking
- Only vehicles that travel faster than 80 km/h may use the outside lane
- No driving on the hard-shoulder

The general motorway speed limit is 120 km/h.

=== Road signs ===
Botswana's old "caution curves" sign

New sign

Traditionally, road signs in Botswana used blue backgrounds rather than the yellow, white, or orange that the rest of the world uses on traffic warning signs. In the early 2010s, officials announced plans to begin phasing out the distinctive blue signs in favour of more typical signs in order to be more in line with the neighbouring Southern African Development Community member states.

=== Interchanges ===
==== Existing ====
- Kenneth Nkhwa Interchange at the junction of A1 / Blue Jacket Street and A3 in Francistown.
- Boatle Interchange in Boatle.

==== Under construction ====
The Government of Botswana is building three interchanges along K.T Motsete Drive (Western Bypass) in Gaborone. This project started in August 2019, and deadline date is set 2022.

=== Longest bridges ===
The Kazungula Bridge in Kazungula and the Okavango River Bridge (constructed 2022) in Mohembo are the two longest bridges.

=== Roadway links with adjacent countries ===
==== Existing ====
- Namibia by Trans-Kalahari Corridor.
- South Africa by A1 highway (Botswana), A2 highway (Botswana), A11 road (Botswana) and A12 highway (Botswana).
- Zambia by A33 road (Botswana).
- Zimbabwe by A1 highway (Botswana).

== Mass transit by road ==
=== Taxicabs ===
In most parts of Botswana, there are many taxicabs of various colours and styles. Botswana has no limitation in taxicab design, so each taxicab company adopts its own design.

=== Minibus taxis ===
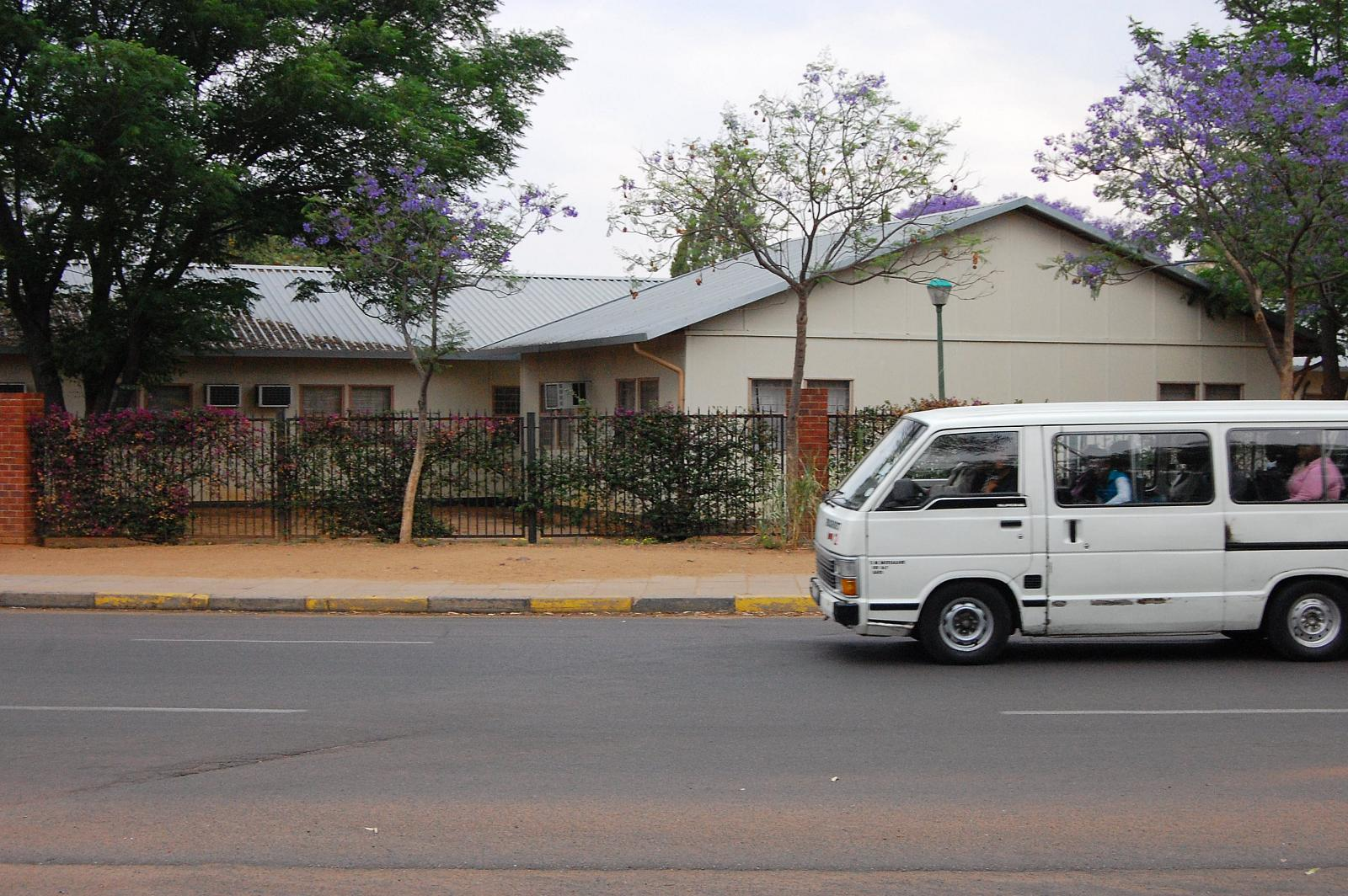
Combi (Minibus taxi)

Minibus taxis, also known as Combi, are the predominant form of transport for people in urban areas of Botswana. Most of them are found within cities, towns, major villages, and even the least populated areas.

They also have their own minibus station within a particular area; only transporting people within that specific area using different and unique routes. This is due to their availability and affordability to the public.

Most minibus taxis do not have a specific departure time that is allocated by the state and most of them have 15-seaters. The minibuses are owned and operated by many individual minibus owners.

=== Coach bus ===
Coach buses are used for longer-distance services within and outside Botswana. These are normally operated by private companies and are the only buses that have departure times allocated by the Ministry of Transport. Coach buses have multiple departures, routes, and stations all over Botswana.

== Water transport ==
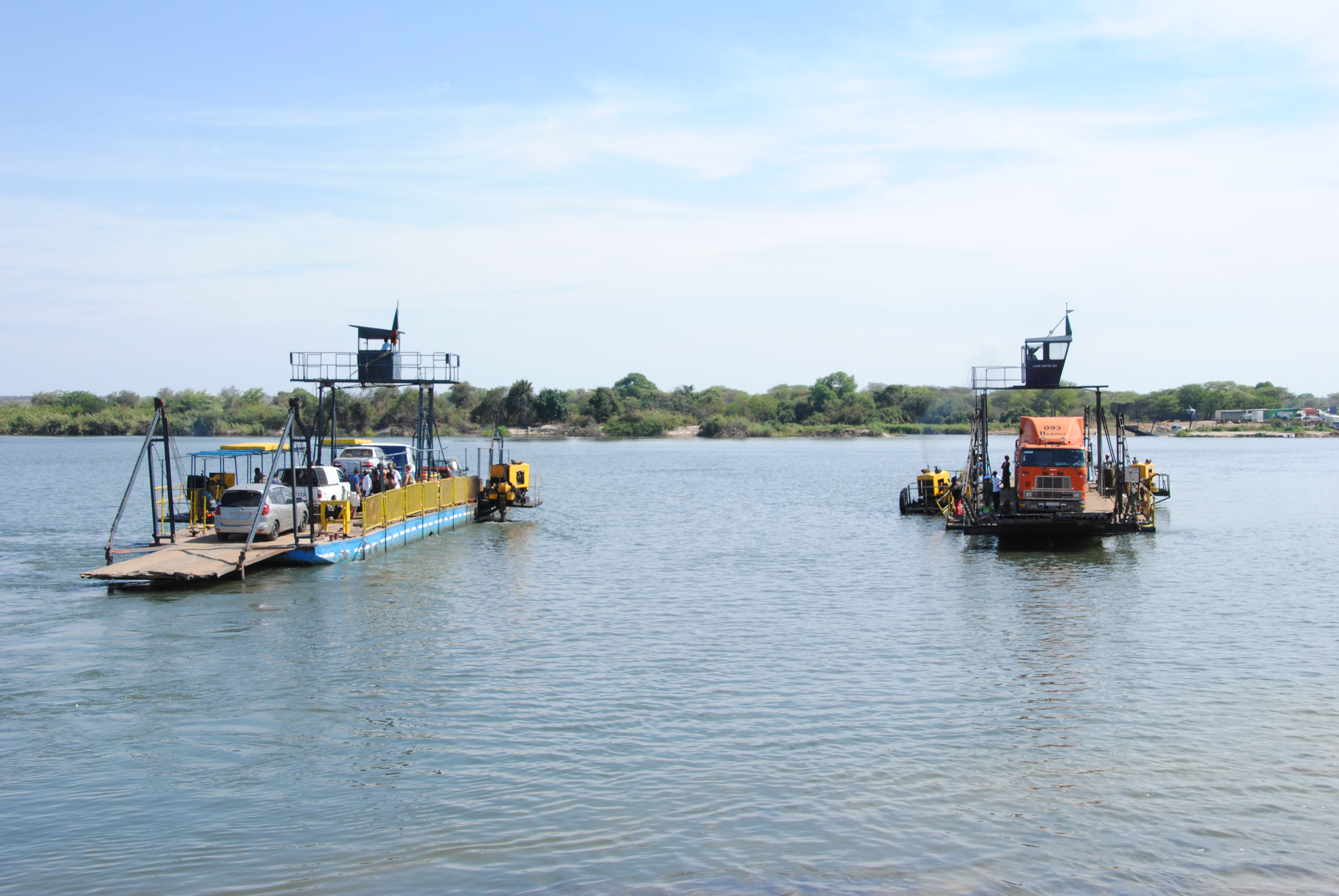
Border crossing (ferry) from Botswana to Zambia

=== Ferries ===
The Kazungula Ferry was a pontoon ferry that crossed the 400-metre-wide (1,300 ft) Zambezi River between Botswana and Zambia.

== Aviation ==
Sir Seretse Khama International Airport in Gaborone, Botswana

In 2004 there were an estimated 85 airports, 10 of which (as of 2005), were paved. The country's main international airport is Sir Seretse Khama International Airport in Gaborone. The government-owned Air Botswana operates scheduled flights to Francistown, Gaborone, Maun, and Selebi-Phikwe. There is international service to Johannesburg, South Africa; Mbabane, Eswatini; and Harare, Zimbabwe. A new international airport near Gaborone was opened in 1984. Air passengers arriving to and departing from Botswana during 2003 totalled about 183,000.

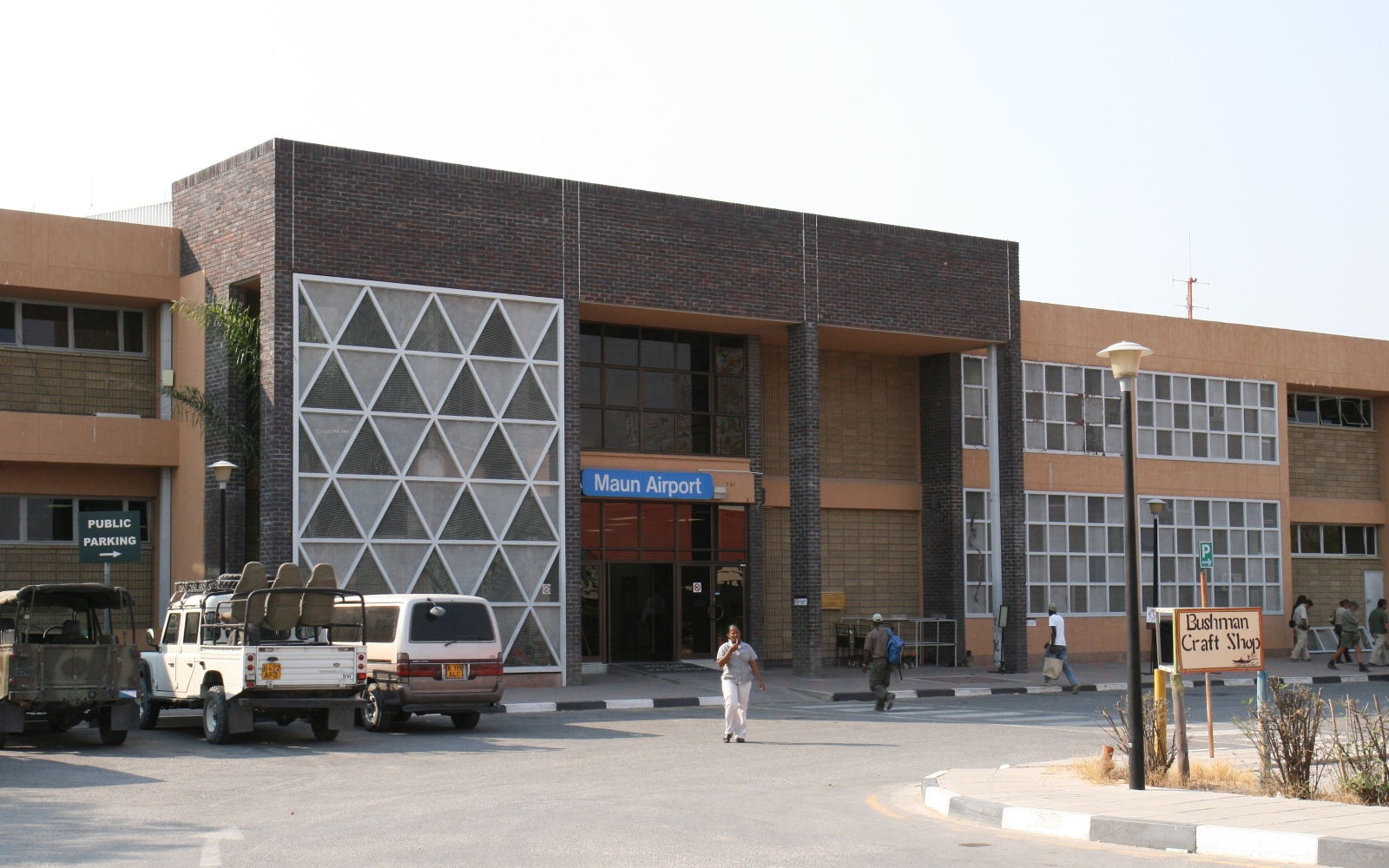
Maun International Airport

=== International airports ===
Botswana has 4 international airports.

- Sir Seretse Khama International Airport in Gaborone.
- Francistown Airport in Francistown.

Kasane International Airport

- Kasane Airport in Kasane.
- Maun Airport in Maun.

==== Proposed airports ====
- "Mophane International Airport" is planned in Palapye Sub-District near Moremi village.

== Pedestrian elevated walkways ==
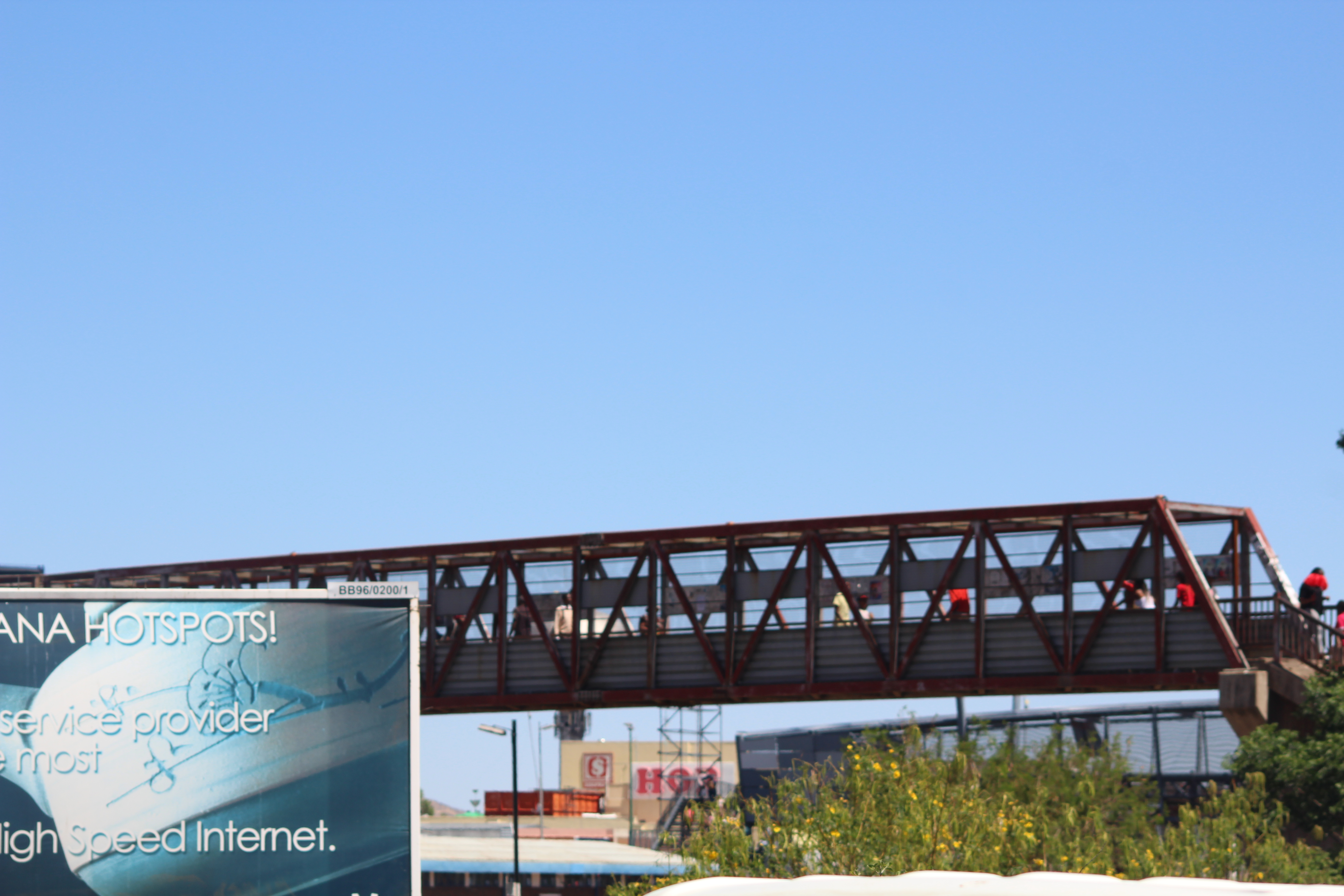
Gaborone's Pedestrian Elevated Walkway

Botswana has many pedestrian elevated walkways at different places.

== Water pipelines ==
Botswana NSC and extension

=== Under construction ===
==== North-South Carrier ====
NSC is a pipeline in Botswana that carries raw water, south for a distance of 360 kilometres (220 mi) to the capital city of Gaborone. It was done in phases. However, phase 1 was completed in 2000.

Phase 2 of the NSC, still under construction, will duplicate the pipeline to carry water from the Dikgatlhong Dam, which was completed in 2012.

A proposed extension to deliver water from the Zambezi would add another 500 to 520 kilometres (310 to 320 mi) to the total pipeline length.

==== Lesotho-Botswana Water Transport ====
The Lesotho-Botswana Water Transfer is an ongoing project which is expected to provide two hundred million cubic meters per year to transfer water to the south-eastern parts of Botswana.

The scheme involves the supply of water to Gaborone from Lesotho via a 600 to 700 kilometres (370 to 430 mi) pipeline.

The project commenced on the 1 August 2018 and is set for completion in June 2020.

=== Proposed ===
==== Sea water desalination project ====
The Government of Botswana intends to sign the Sea Water Desalination Project from Namibia. The project is at a tendering stage.

== Border posts ==
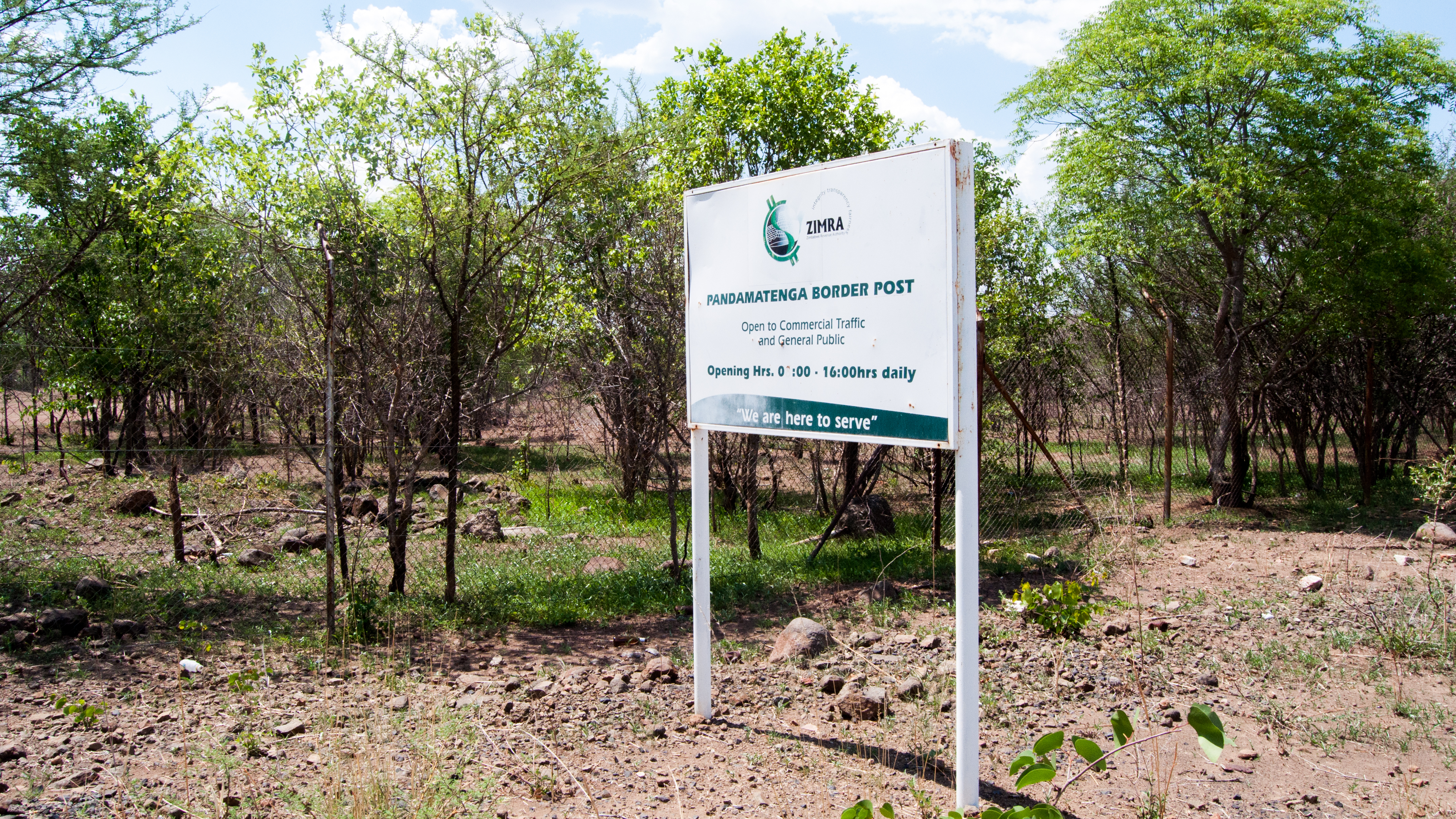
Pandamatenga Border Post Sign

- Bokspits Border Post
- Kazungula Border Post
- Ramatlabama Border Post
- Ramokgwebana Border Post
- Mamuno Border Post
- Pandamatenga Border Post

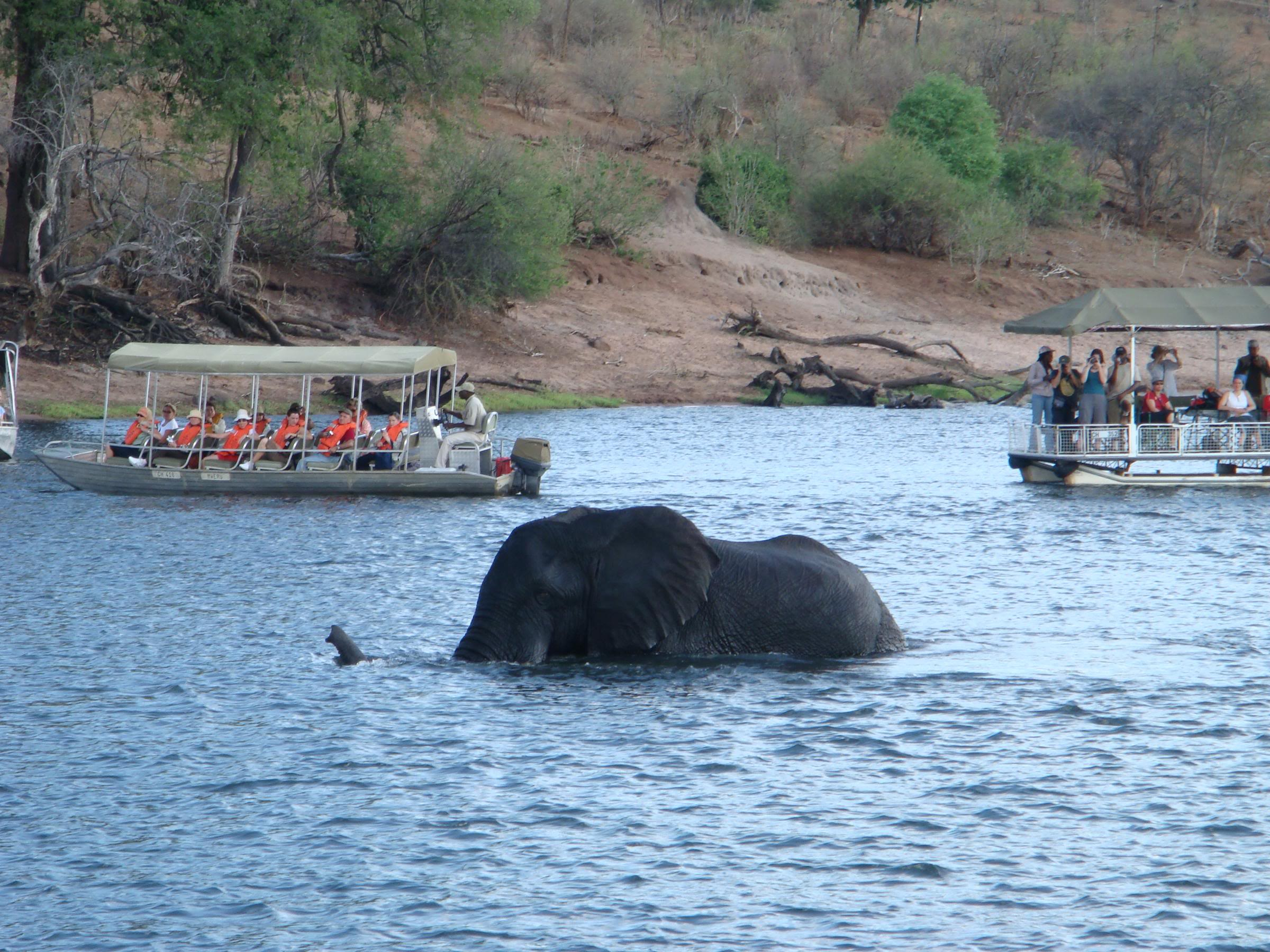
BW Tour boats

== See also ==
- Botswana
- Sprint Couriers
