= Rail transport in Botswana =

Botswana
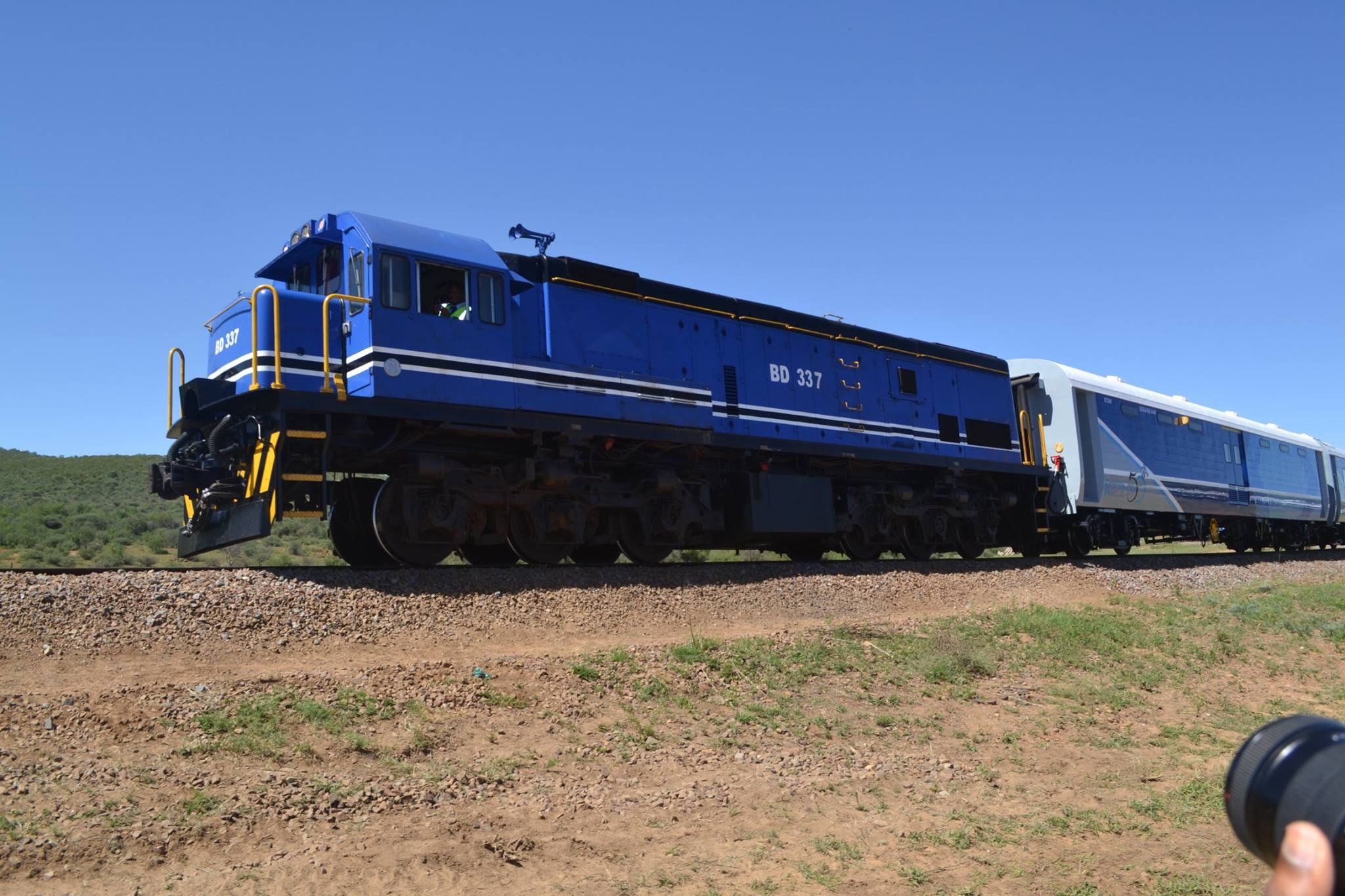
- BR Express Train from Gaborone to Francistown

Operation
- Major operators: Botswana Railways

Statistics
- Passenger-distance: 888 km (552 mi) (2015)

System length
- Total: 888 km (552 mi)

Track gauge
- 1,435 mm (4 ft 8 1/2 in) standard gauge: 1,067 mm (3 ft 6 in)

Features
- No. of stations: 13
Map

Rail services in Botswana are provided by Botswana Railways. Service takes place on the railway spine from the South African border, through Gaborone and Francistown, up to the Zimbabwean border with offshoot routes towards Sowa, Selebi-Phikwe, and Morupule. The railway network consists of 888 km of track; its gauge is 1,067 mm (3 ft 6 in) cape gauge.

Botswana is an associate member of the International Union of Railways (UIC). Botswana has the 93rd longest railway network in the world and it is one of the busiest railways in Africa.

== History ==
=== 1890 – 1900 ===
In May 1893, the Bechuanaland Railway Company Limited was incorporated with a share capital of 6000 pounds with the aim of linking up with the Cape Government Railway in Vryburg and the town of Mafikeng (both in modern-day South Africa). The rail line was eventually completed in October 1894, and was subsequently extended north into modern-day Botswana. The first section of railway track in Botswana was laid in 1896; a full route spanning from Mafikeng to Palapye was completed in May 1897. A link between Palapye and Francistown was completed in September 1897, and the last kilometre of track on the line from Francistown to Bulawayo (in modern-day Zimbabwe) was completed in November 1897.

Mafeking (now Mafikeng) was then the rail-head and the administrative capital of the British Protectorate of Bechuanaland, now Botswana, even though Mafeking was geographically located in the Cape Colony. The town was the base for the construction of the railway through Botswana to Rhodesia (now Zimbabwe), part of the ambition of Cecil Rhodes for a Cape to Cairo railway. The section through Botswana was built to connect to Bulawayo in Zimbabwe, a route previously covered by horse-drawn stage-coaches. The first train arrived in Bulawayo on 19 October 1897.

On June 1, 1899, the Bechuanaland Railway was renamed the Rhodesia Railways Limited.

=== 1900 – 1960 ===
Originally, the Bechuanaland Railway line was operated by the Cape Government Railways, which was subsequently amalgamated into the South African Railways in 1910 and this operational arrangement continued until 1959.

At the end of 1959, the South African Railways purchased the section of the line existing within the Union of South Africa which was the line from Vryburg to Ramatlabama from Rhodesia Railways. Rhodesia Railways then took over the operation of the line from Bulawayo to Mahalapye, with Mahalapye to Mafikeng still being operated by South African Railways.

=== 1960 – 1973 ===
In 1963 the last conventional steam locomotive was used on the line and was replaced by the Garrat type steam locomotive.

On September 26, 1966, South African Railways and Rhodesia Railways agreed a hand over of all of the responsibility for the Bechuanaland Railway line to Rhodesia Railways, four days before Botswana became an independent country. Rhodesia Railways took over the operation of the line from Mahalapye to Mafikeng and thus became responsible for all rail throughout Botswana.

In 1973, Rhodesia Railways started using diesel-traction locomotives, marking an end to steam dominance in Botswana.

=== 1974 - 1987 (Independent Botswanan Rail) ===
In 1974, several branch lines were opened to commercial traffic. These lines were to Morupule Colliery and to Selebi-Phikwe, both financed by the government of Botswana in a state construction effort and the first section of rail independent of the Rhodesian Railways. Since Botswana had achieved independence in 1966, there was an effort to own and operate the Bechuanaland Railway railway within Botswana and so remove outside influence of the railways. However, Botswana had no rolling stock, skilled manpower, or necessary facilities to maintain and operate an independent railway system.

In 1974, the first President of Botswana, Sir Seretse Khama, announced the country's intention of taking over the Rhodesian Railways. Staff training for a new company was provided by other African railways including those in Malawi, Kenya, Swaziland and Rhodesia Railways itself (later to become National Railways of Zimbabwe). A training centre was set up in Francistown as part of this scheme.

During the 1980s there was several international efforts to help Botswana establish a national railway. The United Kingdom and Southern African Development Community (SADC) assisted in developing an overall takeover strategy. Some financing was provided by the Danish Government for technical assistance and the construction of the Mahalapye Locomotive and Wagon Workshops. The Swedish Government provided finance towards the new signaling and telecommunications system as well as sent construction and technical teams. The government of the People's Republic of China assisted with both financial and technical aid in the relaying of the mainline track with continuously welded rail on concrete sleepers.

In 1986, the Botswana Railways was established through an Act of Parliament. And on January 1, 1987, Botswana Railways (BR) began operation of the 641 km railway line when the government bought out the Botswana-based sections of the National Railways of Zimbabwe (a renamed Rhodesian Railways).

=== Post 1987 (Botswana Railways Era) ===
In 1992, the Francistown to Sua Pan branch line began operation.

In 1994, Botswana Railways relocated its headquarters from the capital city, Gaborone to Mahalapye.

In 1999, the first citizen 'General Manager' was appointed head of Botswana Railways.

In 2014, Botswana's Dry Port in Walvis Bay (Sea Rail), Namibia started operating.

Management of the BR is supported by RITES Ltd. of India.

The opening of the Beitbridge Bulawayo Railway in Zimbabwe in 1999 resulted in a major drop in the volume of freight transit and income. Freight traffic fell from a reported 1.1 million tonnes in 1999 to only 150,000 tonnes in 2005. As a response the BR has been considering the construction of a direct line to Zambia (Zambia Railways), bypassing Zimbabwe, to regain income from transit.

== Rail Network ==
There is one mainline acting as the spine of the network, as well as three short branches. There is also an isolated stretch of track at the Zambian border at the Kazungula Bridge, which will be connected to the rest of the network when the Mosetse–Kazungula–Livingstone Railway is finished.

Route	Start location	End location	Length	Status	Rail Type	Reference
Mainline	South Africa Border	Zimbabwe Border	640 km	Operational	50 kg/m continuous welded rail	
Francistown-Sua Pan Railway	Francistown	Sua Pan	174 km	Operational	40 kg/m continuous welded rail	
Serule-Selibe-Phikwe Railway	Serule	Selibe-Phikwe	56 km	Operational	40 kg/m continuous welded rail	
Palapaye-Moruple Railway	Palapaye	Morupule	16 km	Operational	40 kg/m continuous welded rail	
Mosetse–Kazungula–Livingstone Railway	Kazungula Bridge	Zambia Border	0.45 km	Built		
Mosetse–Kazungula–Livingstone Railway	Mosetse	Kazungula Bridge	115 km	Planned		
Trans-Kalahari Railway	Mmamabula coalfields	Namibia Border (extending to the Port of Walvis Bay)	(Full route: 1100 km)	Planned		
Mmamabula-Lephalale Railway	Mmamabula coalfields	South African border (extending to Lephalale in South Africa)	(Full route: 113 km)	Planned		
Ponta Techobanine Railway (Botswana-Zimbabwe-Mozambique Railway)	Botswana interior	Zimbabwe Border (extending to the Techobanine port in Mozambique)	(Full route: 1700 km)	Proposed		

=== Rail links to adjacent countries ===
==== Zimbabwe ====
The original purpose of railway construction in Botswana in the 1890s was to connect to what is modern-day Zimbabwe to South Africa. As such, after the independence from the United Kingdom in the 1960s, the Botswanan rail network already had established links to Zimbabwe, and both use the same gauge, Cape Gauge.

The current network has just one connection to Zimbabwe on the mainline going from Francistown to Bulawayo.

In 2010, a Memorandum of Understanding was signed by the presidents of Mozambique and Botswana on creating a new 1700 km railway through Zimbabwe, allowing for a faster link for all three nations to a new a deep-water port at Techobanine Point in Mozambique. Called the Ponta Techobanine Railway (also known as the Botswana-Zimbabwe-Mozambique Railway), this was reiterated by presidents of all three nations at a summit in 2024.

==== South Africa ====
As with connections to Zimbabwe, the original purpose of the Bechuanaland Railway's construction was to link South Africa to central Africa. As a result, Botswana has had a physical rail connection since its colonial era, and has always been connected to South Africa since its independence.

As a result of being a previously united system, it shares the same gauge as South Africa, Cape Gauge.

In 2023, the Botswana and South Africa's state-owned rail companies signed an Expression of Interest for the Mmamabula-Lephalale Railway link, which would give another connection to South Africa's rail network to Botswana's large coal fields in Mmamabula. Furthermore, the link would also allow for a much faster connection from Botswana to South Africa's Richards Bay and Mozambique's Maputo port allowing for better exports.

==== Namibia ====
There is no direct connection with Namibia, but one does exist via South Africa, although an electrified railway connecting to Lüderitz, Namibia for coal traffic is/was scheduled to open in 2006.

There is currently a planned route called the Trans-Kalahari Railway (TKR), which was first mentioned by both the Namibian and Botswanan governments back in 2014, but had been presumed abandoned until an Expression of Interest was signed in 2023. The route would be a 1,447-kilometer long extension, going from the Mmamabula coalfields situated north of Gaberone to the Port of Walvis Bay. The project was reiterated as being a top priority for the Botswanan government by President Mokgweetsi Eric Masisi in July 2024.

==== Mozambique ====
In August 2010, Mozambique and Botswana signed a memorandum of understanding to develop an 1100 km railway through Zimbabwe, to carry coal from Serule in Botswana to a deep-water port at Techobanine Point in Mozambique. In 2024, the presidents of Botswana, Zimbabwe, and Mozambique met to reiterate their support of the Ponta Techobanine Railway (also known as the Botswana-Zimbabwe-Mozambique Railway) project.

==== Zambia ====
A new rail link between Botswana and Zambia, bypassing Zimbabwe was mooted in 2005 by Botswana Railways (BR) general manager Andrew Lunga. The line was envisaged as running south-westwards from Livingstone, crossing the Zambesi, then continuing to a junction with the existing BR tracks at Mosetse. Lunga's proposal arose following the serious loss of traffic suffered by BR following the opening of the Beitbridge-Bulawayo line, after which annual BR freight tonnage fell from 1.1m per annum to about 150,000. Zimbabwe's economic problems had worsened the situation, prejudicing free traffic flow. The suggested line, Lunga pointed out, would provide important alternative routes linking South Africa, Zambia and the Democratic Republic of Congo.

In 2007, the project restarted with a joint announcement by Zambia and Botswana for the construction of the Kazungula Bridge which spans the Zambezi river and the border between the two countries. This was completed in 2021. The road connection has since been opened to the public, but the railway has since been left isolated, as development of Mosetse–Kazungula–Livingstone Railway is still underway.

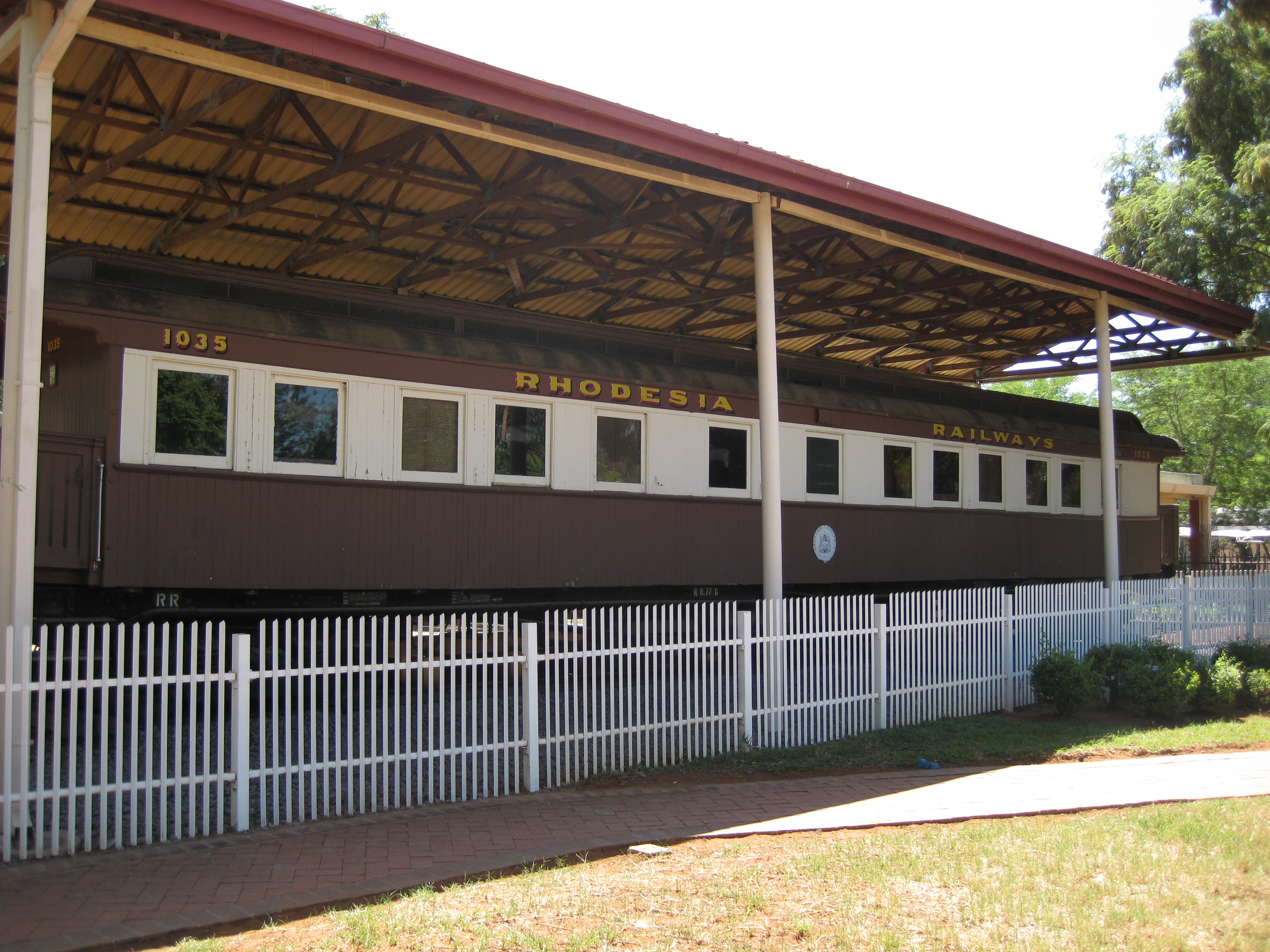
Historic Rhodesia Railway car at the National Museum in Gaborone, Botswana

== Freight trains ==
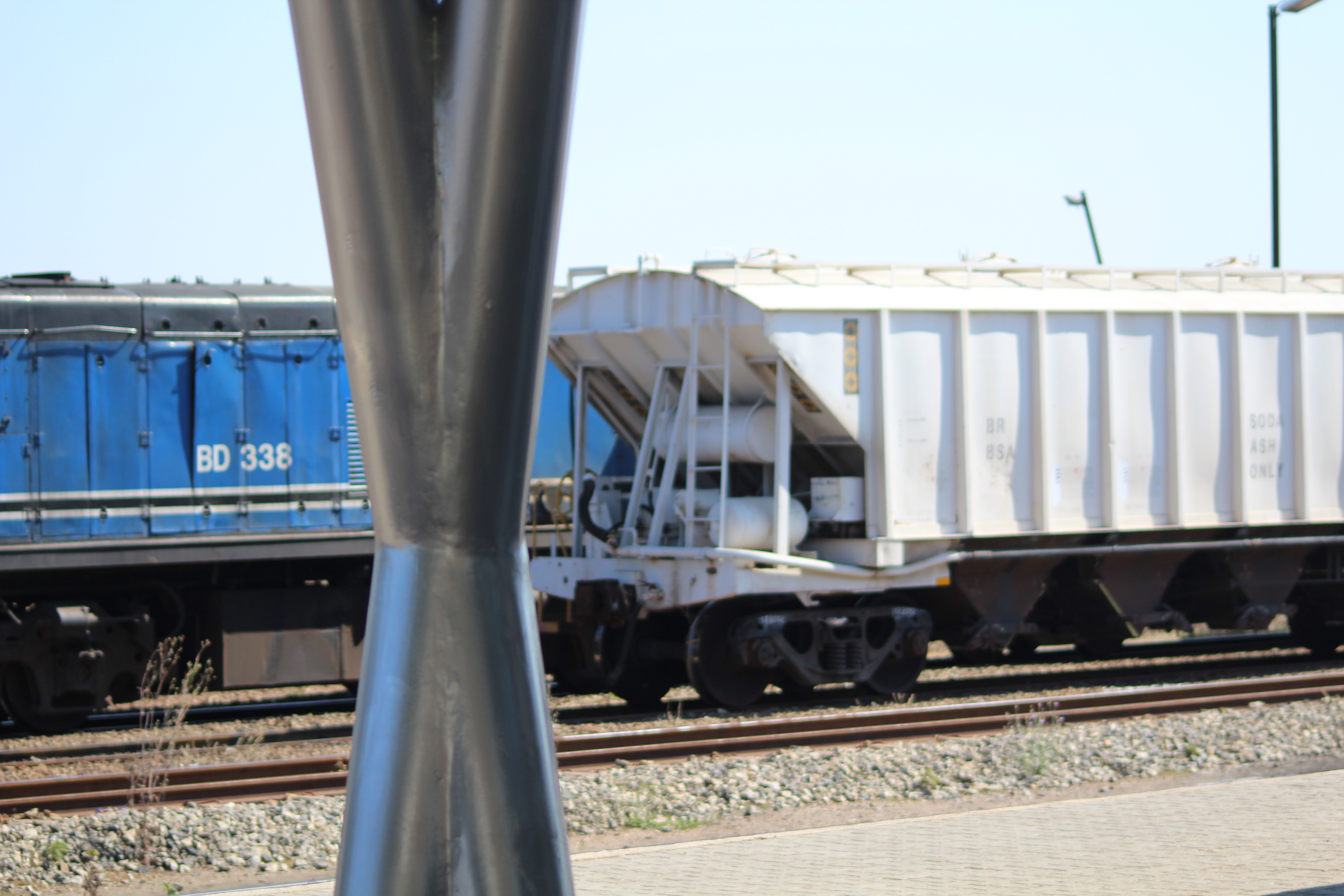
BR Freight Train

Over half of BR's freight traffic is in coal, grain and intermodal freight, and the vast majority of its profits are made in South Africa. It also ships automotive parts and assembled automobiles, sulphur, fertilizers, other chemicals, forest products and other types of commodities. Since 1987, coal has become a major commodity hauled by BR. Coal is shipped in unit trains from coal mines to nearby countries.

=== Dry Ports ===
There are currently three dry ports within Botswana: in Gaborone (GABCON), Francistown (FRANCON), and Palapye (PALCON). Botswana Railways currently operate all three, and they also operate a separate dry port in Walvis Bay in Namibia.

== Passenger trains ==
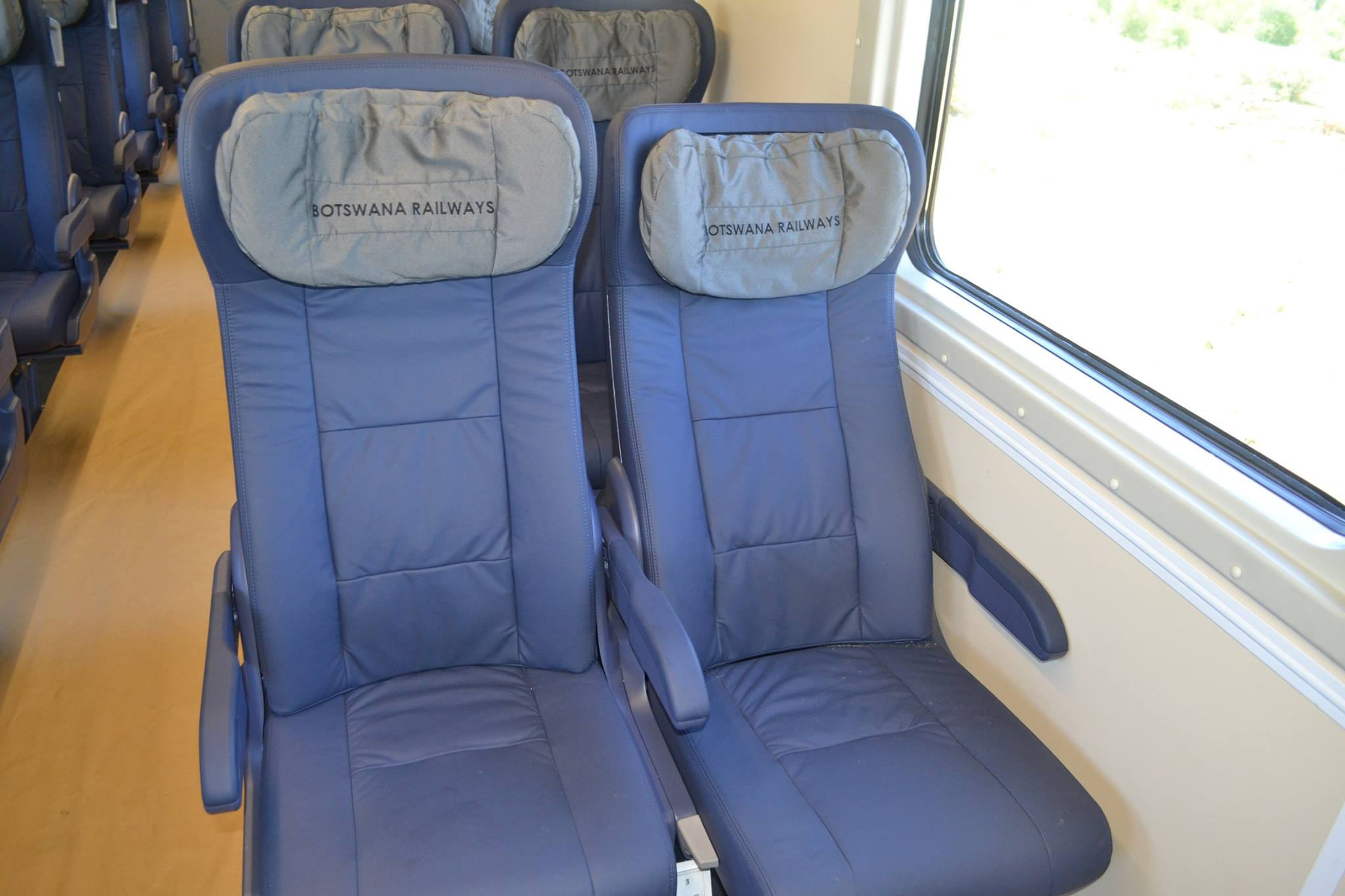
The new comfortable chairs of BR Express

Passenger train services operate across the Botswanan rail network, with most services operating from the capital of Gaborone.

Historically passenger rail was the primary mode of long-distance transport in Botswana until the construction of the national highway system in the late 20th century. From the initial creation of BR, there was two trains a day in either direction. Between 1991 and 1993, these services were upgraded with new rollingstock to include 36 air conditioned coaches, which were expected to be refitted and serviced every 5 years or 500,000 km of use.

=== Closure, Relaunch, and Closure ===
All passenger services were discontinued in 2009, and the only remaining service was an international link to Zimbabwe from Francistown. The closure was for both financial and safety reasons. The new 36 coaches introduced in the early 1990s had never been serviced, leading to over 15 years of maintenance issues and degradation, and causing concerns by Lewis Malikongwa, then Deputy Permanent Secretary of the Ministry of Works and Transport, about their safety. Furthermore, due to the 2008 financial crisis as well as a reported annual loss of P30 million per annum for BR's passenger services, it was decided to suspend all of BR's passenger network.

Some passenger services survived, such as those operated by the National Railways of Zimbabwe (NRZ) running from Bulawayo to Lobatse via Plumtree, Francistown and Gaborone.

However, domestic passenger services were expected to resume in late 2015,^{[1]} but were actually re-introduced in March 2016. This coincided with the purchase of new rolling stock for the BR inventory in December 2014. These were three generator vans, five first class sleepers, 18 economy class coaches, five business class coaches, three buffet cars, and a luggage van.

In 2018, Botswana Railways reintroduced a commuter train service between Gaborone and Lobatse. This service was two nightly passenger trains, one from Lobatse to Francistown, and the other in the reverse direction, with stops in Gaborone, Mahalapye, Palapye, and Serule. The passenger train was termed the "BR Express" (Botswana Railways Express).

In 2020, in the COVID-19 pandemic, BR suspended all services of its BR Express. As of 2024, there are still no passenger services within Botswana.

=== Sleeping and Dining Department ===
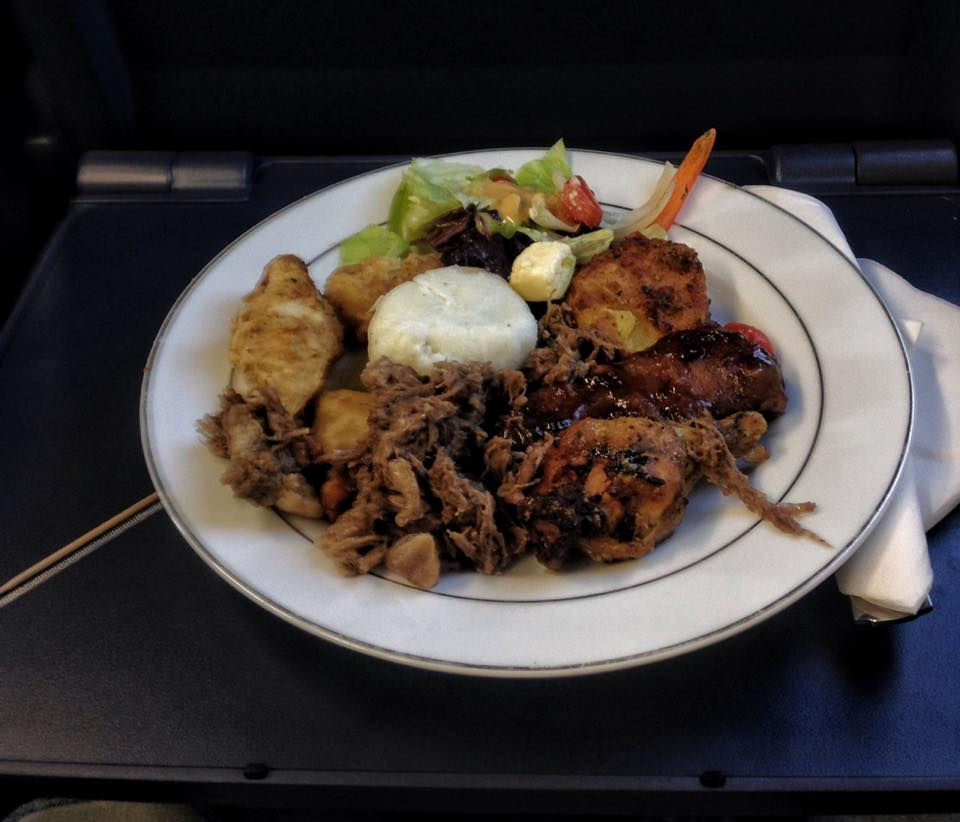
BR Express Dining Department

Sleeping cars are operated by BR, with their initial operation and construction being planned to always be state managed. By providing and operating their own cars, it allowed for better control of the service provided as well as allowed for better revenue retention for the state operator.

== Locomotives ==
=== Diesel locomotives ===
==== Stock from before 2010s ====
- 8 General Electric UM 22C diesel-electric locomotives, 1982
- 20 General Motors Model GT22LC-2 diesel electric locomotives, 1986
- 10 General Electric U15C diesel electric locomotives, 1990

==== Stock from after 2010s ====
- 8 - BD5 Class Locomotives (acquired 2017)
- 3 - BD6 Class Locomotives (acquired 2018)

=== Wagons ===
In total, BR operate 1164 wagons.

Wagon type	Description	Total number	Goods
BCV	Covered Van	89	General goods
BOH	Coal Hoppers	35	Coal
BPT	Petroleum Tankers	79	Diesel/Petrol
BHS	High Sided	271	General Goods
BDS	Drop sided	284	General Goods
BSA	Soda Ash	128	Soda Ash
BSO-1	Salt Wagons	210	Salt
BSO-1	Coal Open Wagons	68	Coal

Date of acquisition:

- 290 - BSO wagons (acquired 2014)
- 204 - BHS wagons (acquired 2014)
- 34 - BDS wagons (acquired 2014)
- 34 - BOH wagons (acquired 2014)
- 160 - BSO-1 Salt Wagons (acquired 2012)

== Rail systems in nearby countries ==
The following countries mostly use 1,067 mm (3 ft 6 in) gauge and are mostly connected together. Countries beyond those listed use other gauges.

- Angola
- Republic of the Congo – isolated
- Democratic Republic of the Congo – half isolated
- Eswatini
- Lesotho
- Malawi
- Mozambique, under repair
- Namibia
- South Africa
- Tanzania same gauge as far as Dar es Salaam –
  transshipment to 1,000 mm (3 ft 3 3/8 in) gauge at Kidatu
- Zambia
- Zimbabwe

== See also ==
- Transport in Botswana
- Botswana Railways
- Botswana
- Cape gauge
