= History of rail transport in Zambia =

This article is part of the history of rail transport by country series

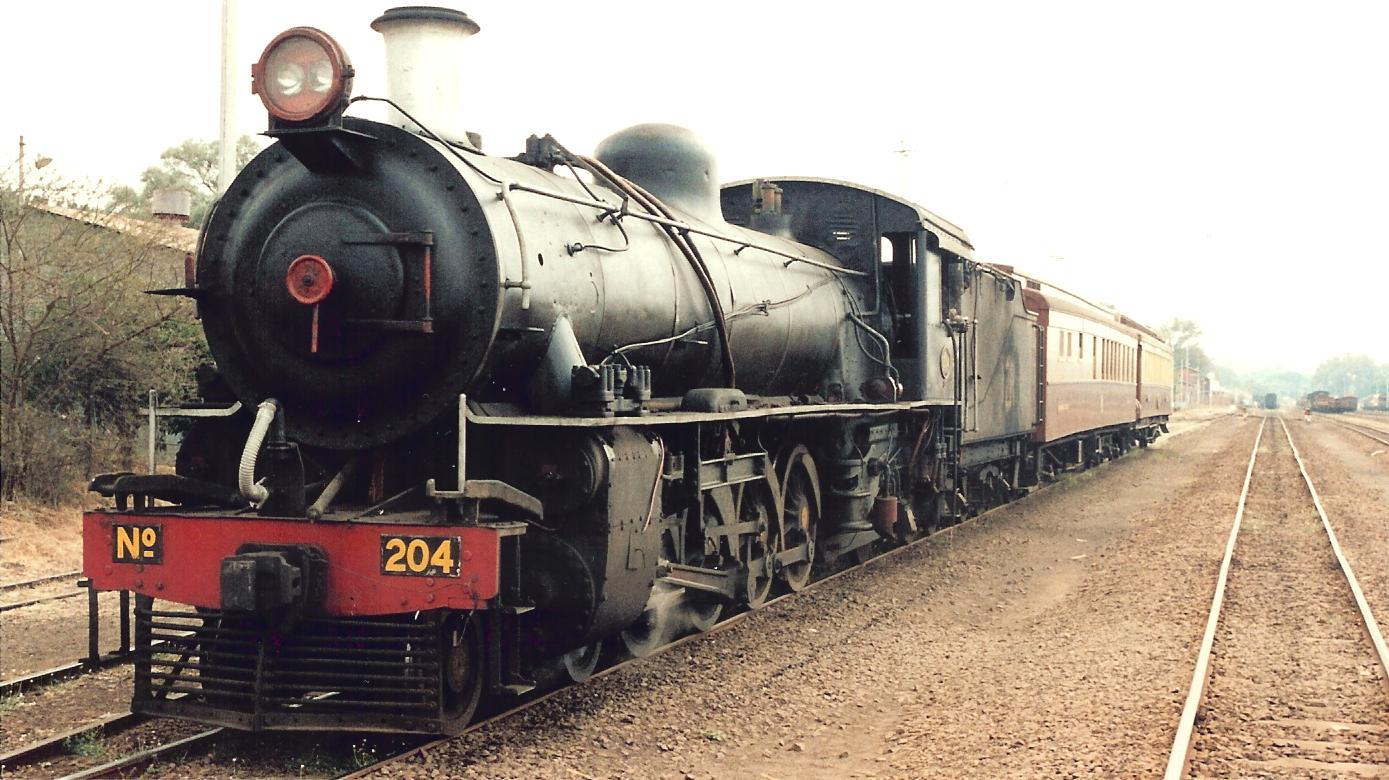
Zambia Railways 12th class 4-8-2 No 204, with a Victoria Falls Safari Express train, at Livingstone, Zambia, 1997

The history of rail transport in Zambia began at the start of the twentieth century. The railways became the principal mode of transport and a vital component of the economy by the 1950s, with most economic development taking place along the line of rail. During the 1960s and 1970s political and economic issues challenged the network and its operation, and some of these still have effects today.

== Northern Rhodesia ==
=== Original development of the railway network from the south ===
The British South Africa Company (BSAC) was responsible for building the Rhodesian railway system in the period of primary construction which ended in 1911, when the main line through Northern Rhodesia (now Zambia) reached the Congo border and the Katanga copper mines. Railway construction in British South Africa Company-administered Northern Rhodesia (and its predecessor territory) was undertaken by Rhodesia Railways, established in 1899, and Mashonaland Railway, as an extension of the system in Southern Rhodesia. Railway development was driven by Cecil Rhodes, whose original intention was for a railway extending across the Zambesi to Lake Tanganyika, considered as part of a great Cape-Cairo railway linking all the British colonies of Africa. However, Rhodes was as much a capitalist in his motivation as a visionary, and when little gold was found in Mashonaland in Southern Rhodesia, he accepted that the scheme to reach Lake Tanganyika had no economic justification. Railways built by private companies without government subsidies need enough of the type of traffic that can pay high freight rates to recover their construction costs. The agricultural products that fuelled much of Rhodesia's early economic growth could not provide this traffic; large quantities of minerals could. Most early railways in Africa were built by the British government rather than Chartered Companies. The need to raise capital and produce dividends prevented most Chartered Companies from undertaking such infrastructure investments. However, in the early period of railway construction, BSAC obtained finance from South African companies including Consolidated Gold Fields and De Beers in which Rhodes was a dominant force. BSAC also benefited from the personal fortunes of Rhodes before his death.

=== Livingstone to Broken Hill ===
The railway reached Bulawayo in 1897, and was extended to the Victoria Falls in 1902. Lines were built in the 3 ft 6 in (1,067 mm) or Cape gauge. The railway arrived in the future Zambia early in 1905, when the 150 km (93 mi) long Livingstone–Kalomo line was built in advance of completion in September of that year of the Victoria Falls Bridge from the then Southern Rhodesia to Livingstone. The first wagons on the line were hauled by oxen, then a single locomotive was conveyed in pieces by cableway across the gorge where the bridge was being built to start up operations to Kalomo in advance of the main line connection.

The next section was to Broken Hill, (now Kabwe), for which another major bridge was required to cross the Kafue River. The 427 m (1,401 ft) long Kafue Railway Bridge, the longest on the Rhodesian Railways or Zambian Railways network, was completed in 1906 and the railway reached the Broken Hill mine the same year. BSAC was assured that there would be much traffic from the lead and zinc mine, but this did not materialize because technical mining problems. The railway could not meet the costs of the construction loans, and the company faced major financial problems. The only area likely to generate sufficient mineral traffic to relieve these debts was Katanga in the then Congo Free State, the private property of King Leopold II of Belgium.

=== The role of the Copperbelt ===
Initially, it had been concluded that Katanga's surface copper deposits were not rich enough to justify the capital cost of building a railway to the coast, but expeditions between 1899 and 1901 proved their value. Surface copper deposits found in Northern Rhodesia before the First World War proved uneconomic to develop. In 1906 Union Minière du Haut Katanga was formed to exploit the Katanga mines. For transport, King Leopold favoured a route entirely in Congolese territory: rail to Ilebo, river barges on the Kasai and Congo Rivers to Leopoldville (now Kinshasa)-and then rail to the Atlantic port of Matadi. (That route became operable from 1928). However, in 1908, BSAC agreed with Leopold to continue the Rhodesian railway from Broken Hill via Ndola to Elizabethville (now Lubumbashi) and the mines, with a Katangan railway company operating in the Congo. Over the next two decades, almost all of Katanga's copper was shipped over the Rhodesian network east to the Indian Ocean port of Beira via the Beira–Bulawayo railway. The Katanga mines' supply of coal and coke mostly came from Wankie in Southern Rhodesia, the cheapest available source. Rhodesia Railways' revenue from Katanga enabled it to carry agricultural produce at low rates.

In the 1920s richer underground copper ores were discovered in Northern Rhodesia and branch lines were built to more mines in the Copperbelt: from Ndola to Kitwe (1926), Mufulira (1927), Luanshya.(1928), and Kitwe to Chingola (1930). Large-scale development of the Copperbelt began with an increasing world market for copper.

=== The Benguela Railway to the Atlantic ===
In 1929, the Benguela Railway was completed through to the Belgian Congo border, to join up with a Katangan line coming from Tenke and Elizabehville. This gave the Copperbelt mines on both sides of the border access to the Atlantic port of Lobito Bay. The Benguela Railway provided the shortest, most direct route for copper from both Katanga and Northern Rhodesia, but it was never used to full capacity because both the Congo and the Rhodesias restricted its traffic in favour of the Congo route and the Beira Railway. Even after the Benguela route was opened, up to a third of Katanga's copper went to Beira. The Northern Rhodesian copper exports continued mainly to Beira because its mining economy was linked to the south.

=== End of BSAC Charter and start of colonial rule from London ===
When the BSAC administration of the Rhodesias was terminated and the territories became protectorates of the UK, an agreement between the Colonial Secretary in London and the company of 29 September 1923 recognised that BSAC was entitled to protection because of the size of its railway investment in Northern and Southern Rhodesia. The agreement required the governors of each territory to refer any Bill authorizing the construction of new railways or altering the rates that the existing railways charged to the Colonial Secretary. This prevented the legislatures of Northern or Southern Rhodesia from introducing competition or exerting pressure on the BSAC-controlled railways to reduce rates without British government sanction.

=== Nationalisation ===
European settlers in Northern Rhodesia had two main criticisms of British South Africa Company railway policy. Firstly, that its financial arrangements unfairly benefited the company and its shareholders, and secondly, that the settlers paid for these benefits through exorbitant railway rates. Although the allegations were probably ill-founded, from 1914 onwards, the European settlers called for the replacement of BSAC control of the railways through nationalisation. In 1923 responsible government was achieved, but rather outright nationalisation, the settler government opted for a form of public control under the Railway Act of 1926. This left BSAC as the owner of the railways, which were called Beira and Mashonaland and Rhodesia Railways until 1927, and Rhodesia Railways Limited after. In 1947 Southern Rhodesian Government acquired the assets of Rhodesia Railways Limited.

=== Rhodesia Railways at its peak ===
During Federation (1953–63) Rhodesia Railways came under federal control rather than belonging to Southern Rhodesia alone, and it reached its peak of operations. In Northern Rhodesia it was the primary export corridor for copper, which was the highest value and the most consistent freight traffic. In 1952 copper was 5.7% of freight by weight at 416,000 tons, but a much higher proportion by value. Imports of fuel, machinery and other goods were mostly carried by rail. It was an efficient and relatively low-cost operation. Economic activity including commercial-scale agriculture was heavily concentrated along the line of rail.

Rhodesia Railways was also the principal international passenger travel route for Northern Rhodesia until overtaken by air and road in the 1950s. Until the mid-1960s, sleeper trains still went from Ndola via Livingstone to Bulawayo with onward connections in Southern Rhodesia and to Mozambique and South Africa.

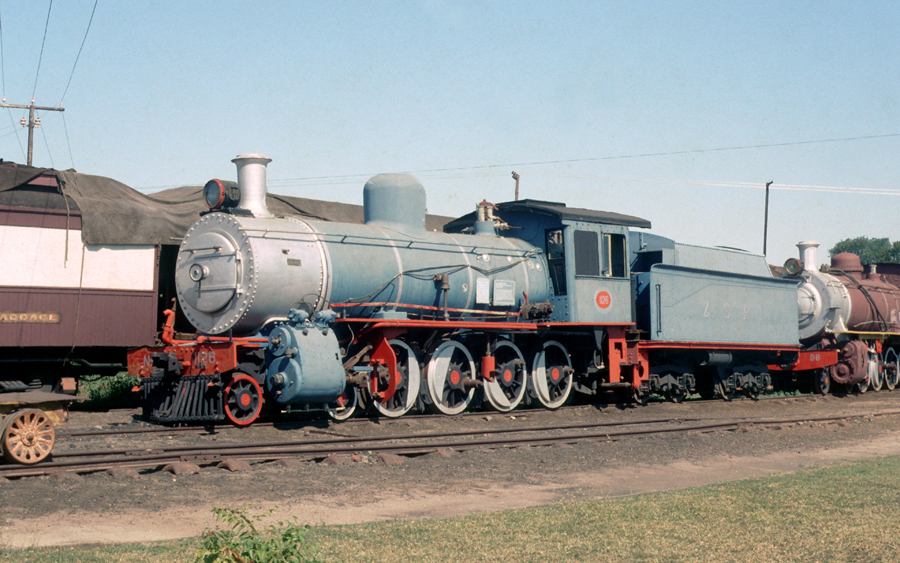
Sharp, Stewart and Company built Zambezi Sawmills Railway Class 8A No 1126, at the Railway Museum (Zambia), 31 May 1990

=== Mulobezi Railway ===
In 1923 to 1924, the Zambezi Sawmills Railway – later Mulobezi Railway – was built as a private railway for the extraction of teak from Mulobezi and Kataba to its north. It linked with several branch lines, and also operated passenger services as far as Kataba.

== Zambia ==
=== Rhodesia Railways in Zambia 1964–67 ===
In October 1964, Northern Rhodesia became independent under the name Zambia, and Southern Rhodesia continued as a self-governing British colony, now called just Rhodesia. The railway in Zambia continued to be managed by Rhodesian Railways but was now jointly owned by Rhodesia and Zambia, and was valued in 1965 at £100,000,000 sterling (equivalent to US$3.4 billion in 2026).

=== Rhodesia's UDI ===
The white minority government in Rhodesia was opposed to the British policy of no independence before majority rule, and in November 1965 unilaterally declared independence from the UK. It was not recognised internationally and the UK and international community introduced trade sanctions against it. Zambia's economy and transport links were too closely integrated with Rhodesia's for Zambia cut off trade. In particular most of Zambia's copper exports still went through Rhodesia and the only alternative, via Zaire (former Congo) to the Benguela Railway was limited by lack of spare capacity and instability in Zaire. So the railways in Zambia and Rhodesia continued to be integrated among increasing hostility between the two countries until July 1967, when the Zambian part of Rhodesian Railways was separated and renamed Zambia Railways (ZRL) under its own board.

=== 1973 Closure of rail operations at the Zambia-Rhodesia border ===
In an attempt to comply with trade sanctions on Rhodesia, Zambia tried to increase its use of the Benguela Railway and develop new routes and resources. Planning for the TAZARA Railway and the Maamba Colliery was started, the latter to reduce reliance on Rhodesian coal. Trade through Rhodesia steadily reduced and Zambia closed its border including the Victoria Falls railway bridge in 1973. This had an enormous economic cost to Zambia over the next decade, especially as instability and the Angolan Civil War reduced the operations of the Benguela Railway from 1975 onwards.

=== 1978–80 Reopening of rail services at the Zambia-Zimbabwe border ===
In 1978 Rhodesia became Zimbabwe-Rhodesia under Prime Minister Abel Muzorewa when the minority white government negotiated a new constitution with the United African National Council in an attempt to end the international community's sanctions and the Bush War. But it did not work. However Zambia did reopen the border and restart limited rail services across Victoria Fall Bridge. The border was not fully opened until the independence of its southern neighbour was internationally recognised as Zimbabwe in April 1980.

== TAZARA Railway ==
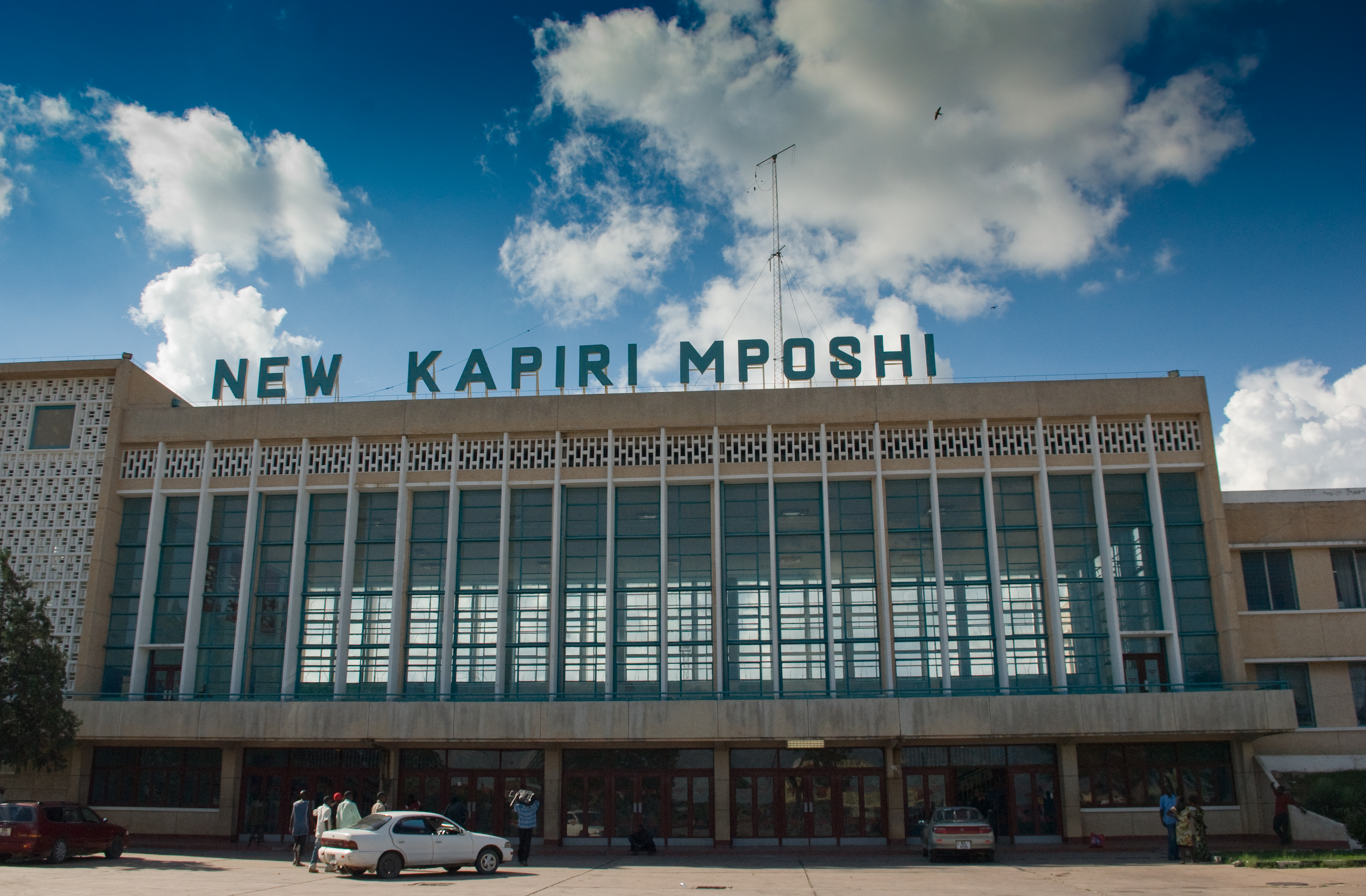
New Kapiri Mposhi railway station, TAZARA Railway, 2009

From 1964, discussions took place about a proposed railway line between Tanzania and Zambia. The government of the People's Republic of China sponsored construction of the railway specifically to eliminate Zambia's economic dependence on Rhodesia and South Africa. The contractual foundations were closed in 1967, and one year later, the Tanzania-Zambia Railway (TAZARA) was established, as a condominial railway owned by Tanzania and Zambia.

The TAZARA was built in the 3 ft 6 in (1,067 mm) or Cape gauge, which was common in southern Africa, but new to Tanzania. The line was handed over to the company as it was completed in sections in 1973 and 1974.

The TAZARA has been a major economic conduit in the region. However, it has never been profitable and more recently it has suffered from competition from road transport (such as the Trans–Caprivi Highway and Walvis Bay Corridor to Namibia) and the re-orientation of Zambia's economic links towards South Africa after the end of apartheid. As of October 2008, a Tanzanian newspaper described the TAZARA's condition as being "on the verge of collapse due to financial crisis", with the operator being three months late on paying worker's wages and most of its 12 locomotives being out of service. At the beginning of 2010 the Chinese government gave the financially crippled operator a US$39 million interest-free loan to revive its operations.

== Chipata–Mchinji line to the Sena and Nacala railways ==
The line from Chipata in Zambia to Mchinji in Malawi was planned in 1982 and completed in 2010, as a northern extension of the Sena Railway through Malawi to Beira. It also connects via a junction at Nkaya to the port of Nacala via the Nacala Railway providing Zambia with an alternative access to the sea. Its aim was to provide a freight corridor, in conjunction with road transport, for copper ore exports and general freight imports to and from Nacala, and the export of cement clinker from Lusaka District to Blantyre. The works for this extension were completed in 2010. In 2013 the line was reported as idle because there are few facilities at Chipata. Freight services operated in 2014–2016 but have been idle since, though talks took place in 2025 between ZRL and Mozambique Ports and Railways (CFM) on restarting.

== See also ==
- History of Zambia
- Bibliography of the history of Zambia § Railroads
- Rail transport in Zambia
- Railway Museum (Zambia)
