= Ponta Techobanine Railway =

Proposed railway corridor in Africa

The Ponta Techobanine Railway is a proposed railway corridor aimed at enhancing connectivity between Botswana, Zimbabwe, and Mozambique, and is part of a wider scheme to create a large deep water port in Techobanine. The railway corridor would serve as a strategic transport route for facilitating trade, resource transportation, and passenger travel across Southern Africa. While no continuous railway line currently links these countries directly, the concept of the Ponta Techobanine Railway focuses on leveraging existing infrastructure, expanding and upgrading key lines, and introducing new connections to enhance regional trade and economic integration.

The project is expected to cost US$6.5 billion and be 1,700 km in length.

== Route ==
Locations of Francistown, Chicualacuala, Maputo, and Ponte Techobanine.

Locations of Dinbete, Mmamabula, Dovedale, and Lephalale.

The Ponta Techobanine Railway is centered around improving the rail linkages between Botswana, Zimbabwe, and Mozambique, facilitating smoother trade routes and improving access to Mozambique’s ports, especially the newly planned Ponta Techobanine port.

=== Existing lines and possible upgrades ===
While there is no direct rail line currently linking all three countries, existing rail infrastructure could be upgraded to form the basis of the corridor.

1. Botswana-Zimbabwe Connection: Currently, Botswana has its Mainline, which goes to the Zimbabwean border, and then continues on to Bulawayo. This was originally part of the Cape to Cairo Railway, and goes on to connect to South Africa. As part of the Ponta Techobanine Railway, a more direct rail route between Botswana and Zimbabwe will be built, with the aim of reducing journey time to Chicualacuala and the rest of the Limpopo Railway.
2. Zimbabwe-Mozambique Connection: Zimbabwe’s existing railway connections with Mozambique, particularly the Limpopo Railway with the section between Chicualacuala and Maputo, is intended to be upgraded as part of the project.
3. Mozambique’s Port Access: Mozambique is currently developing the new Ponta Techobanine deep water port, which will provide for a much faster and effective ocean access for both Botswanan and Zimbabwean trade.

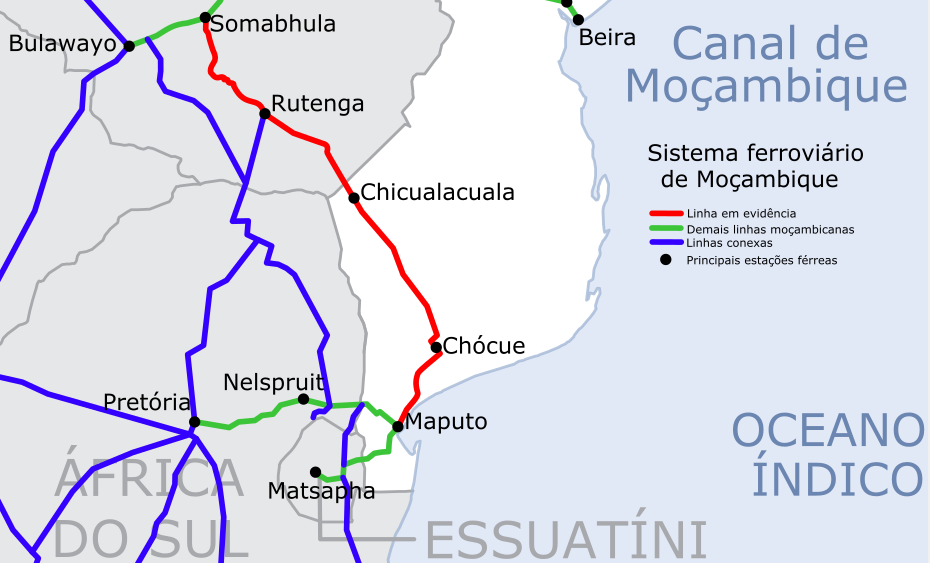
Limpopo railway map (red line); railways with junction (in green); other railway routes (in blue).

== Current status ==
The original memorandum of understanding for this project was signed in April 2011.

In 2016, an additional memorandum was signed and revised in 2022.

In August 2024, the presidents of Zimbabwe, Mozambique, and Botswana signed an agreement to implement the $6.5 billion project. It was agreed that the route from Bulawayo to Chicualacuala, located on Zimbabwe's southern border with Mozambique, required improvements. It was agreed that National Railways of Zimbabwe, Botswana Railways, and Mozambique Ports & Railways would collectively invest US$10 million for upgrades for NRZ to procure of ballast, lubricants, and spare parts to improve the route's condition.

== Existing infrastructure and operators ==
The railway is proposed to be organised and operated by the three national operators of Botswana Railways (BR), National Railways of Zimbabwe (NRZ) and Caminhos de Ferro de Moçambique (CFM).

=== Botswana Railways (BR) ===
Botswana's railway system, operated by Botswana Railways, predominantly serves as a north-south transport network connecting the country to South Africa. The system facilitates the movement of goods, particularly coal and minerals, to South African ports. While Botswana's rail network does not directly connect to Mozambique, currently cargo is transported via Zimbabwe through the Botswanan Mainline and the Beira–Bulawayo Railway. There are plans to also create the Trans-Kalahari Railway, which would create a new West Coast to East Coast connection via the Ponta Techobanine Railway going from Namibia all the way to Mozambique.

=== National Railways of Zimbabwe (NRZ) ===
The National Railways of Zimbabwe operates one of the most important railway systems in Southern Africa, historically linking Zimbabwe to neighboring countries like South Africa, Zambia, and Mozambique. The network includes connections to Mozambique’s rail system, particularly the Beira–Bulawayo Railway route. However, the NRZ infrastructure faces challenges due to underinvestment, and ongoing efforts are being made to revitalize and upgrade the system. The NRZ’s existing lines could play a critical role in the proposed Ponta Techobanine Railway, being the main link for both Botswana and Zambia to the African East Coast.

=== Caminhos de Ferro de Moçambique (CFM) ===
Caminhos de Ferro de Moçambique is the state-run railway operator in Mozambique, responsible for the country’s extensive rail network. The railway system serves as a key link between Mozambique's ports and its landlocked neighbors. Mozambique's railway infrastructure is undergoing upgrades and expansion to accommodate growing trade volumes. The proposed Ponta Techobanine Railway aims to enhance Mozambique’s rail connectivity with Zimbabwe and Botswana, creating a vital transport route to the Indian Ocean.
