= Mmamabula-Lephalale Railway =

Proposed railway line in Africa

The Mmamabula–Lephalale Railway is a proposed railway line intended to connect the Mmamabula coalfields in Botswana with Lephalale in South Africa. The primary objective of the project is to facilitate the transportation of coal from Botswana to South Africa for power generation, with the potential for export via South African ports. The railway aims to address the logistical challenges posed by Botswana's landlocked geography, while promoting regional economic integration and cooperation between the two countries. It is a major plan in expansion for both the South African rail network, as well as the Botswanan rail network.

== Background ==
Botswana is home to significant coal reserves, particularly in the Mmamabula region, which is located in the southeastern part of the country. However, due to its landlocked position, Botswana faces challenges in exporting its coal resources. South Africa, with its established rail infrastructure and access to international ports, provides a natural route for exporting coal. The scheme has been highlighted as improving export via the East African coast, particularly through the port at Richards Bay. The Mmamabula coalfields are situated approximately 150 kilometers from Lephalale, a key industrial hub in South Africa's Limpopo Province, which is home to major power stations allowing for large market potential for Botswanan coal. Lephalale is also well connected to South Africa's national rail network, making it a potential ideal destination for exporting general products to the global market.

== Proposed route ==
Locations of Dinbete, Mmamabula, Dovedale, and Lephalale.

The proposed route goes from the Botswanan mainline, splitting off on a section between Dibete and Dinokwe. The route would then go East, crossing the Bonwapitse River shortly after it combines with Serorome River. It then heads further East with a slight northerly incline, going just North of Dovedale. It then heads to the Limpopo River, crossing the South African border after the Mahalapye River joins but before the Bonwapitse River joins. Once in South Africa, it heads South to Lephalale to join the existing South African rail network.

From Lephalale, it is expected that exported goods bound for the global market will go through the major ports at Richards Bay in South Africa as well as the Maputo port in Mozambique.

Overall, the route will be approximately 113km long, with 68.9km located in Botswana and 44.1km located in South Africa. The entire 68.9km in Botswana will be greenfield development, while the South Africa portion will be 17.1km of greenfield and 27km of brownfield development. In total, the link will have a capacity of approximately 24 million tonnes per annum.

The current expected operators are South Africa's state freight company Transnet and Botswanan's state rail organisation of Botswanan Railways.

== Economic impact and regional integration ==
=== Economic development ===
The construction and operation of the Mmamabula–Lephalale Railway would likely have significant economic benefits for both Botswana and South Africa. As 80% of South Africa's energy needs are generated from coal, the improved connection will allow for cheaper and more reliable connections to feed this demand.

It has also been stated by the Botswanan Railways that approximately 3000 jobs will be created by the expansion, and that an additional 200 billion tonnes of coal will be made accessible.

=== Regional integration ===
The project is a key component of broader efforts to enhance regional cooperation and integration within Southern Africa. The railway would improve trade and connectivity between Botswana and South Africa, and further to Mozambique, aligning with regional infrastructure development initiatives such as the Southern African Development Community (SADC) transport corridors. This integration could further boost economic growth, enhance supply chains, and contribute to regional stability.

== Current status and funding ==
In March 2023, both Transnet and Botswanan Railways signed a development agreement to discuss the route and scale of the project.

As of December 2024, the Mmamabula–Lephalale Railway is in the planning and feasibility study phase; however, the project has currently missed its original bidding dates with no announcements on its future. Both governments have expressed support for the railway, recognizing its potential economic and strategic importance. However, construction has not yet begun, and funding negotiations are still underway.

=== Funding and financing ===
As with many large infrastructure projects, securing funding for the Mmamabula–Lephalale Railway is a major challenge. The railway's estimated cost, including construction and operation, could run into billions of dollars. Various financing models, including public-private partnerships (PPPs), loans, and government investment, have been discussed as funding opportunities.
