= Mulobezi Railway =

Railway in Zambia

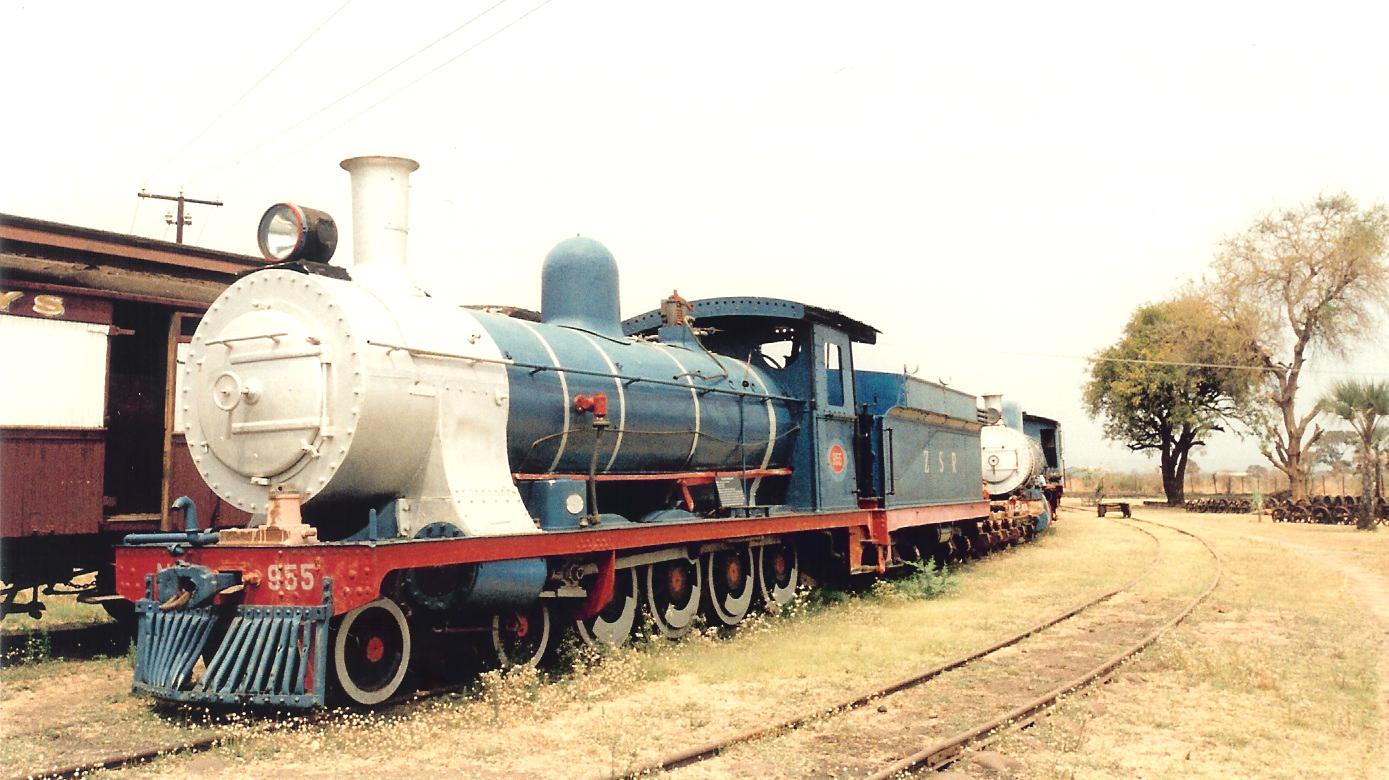
Neilson & Company built Zambezi Sawmills Railway Class 7 locomotive No 955, at the Railway Museum (Zambia), 11 September 1997.

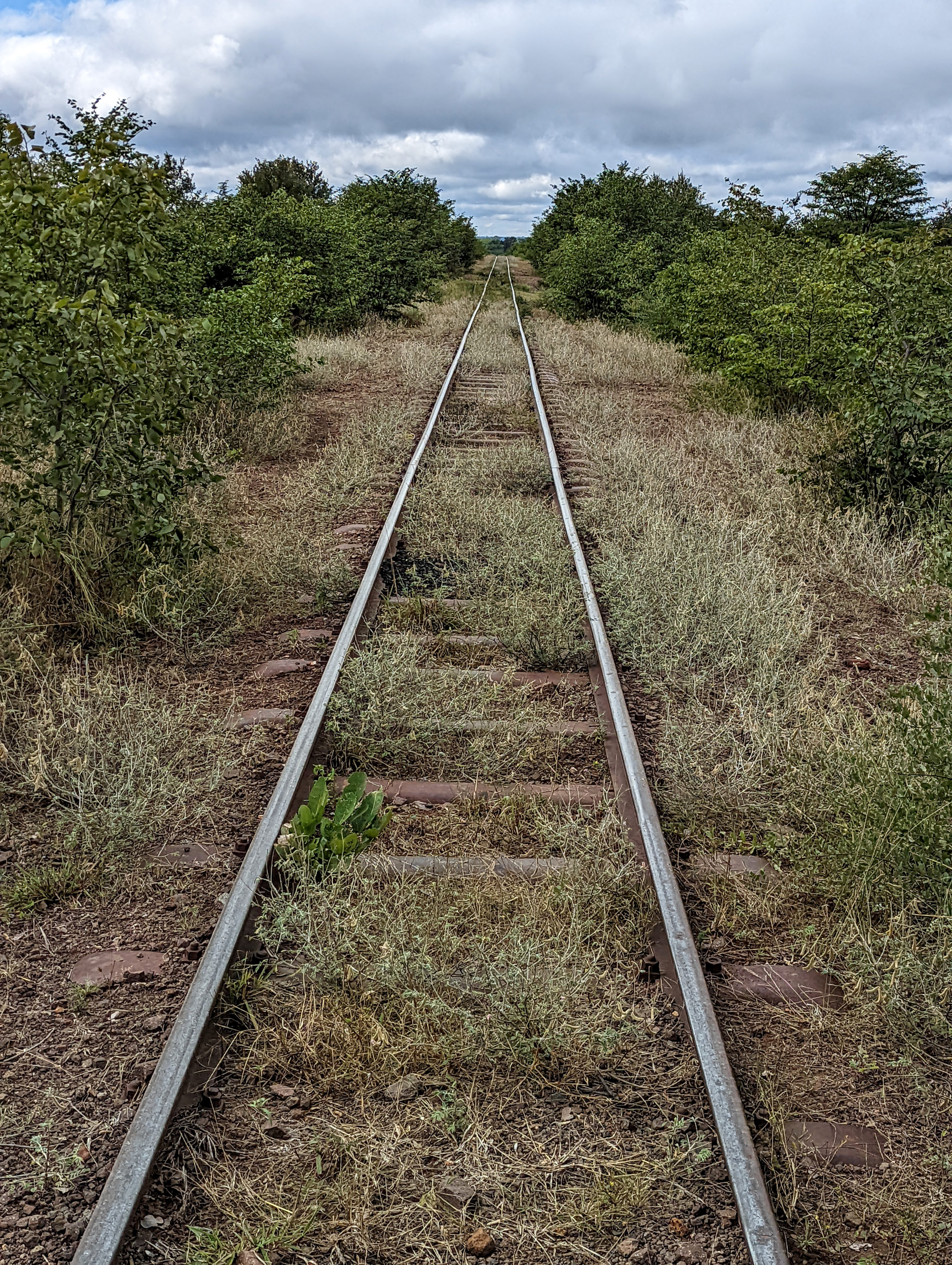
Mulobezi Railway in Mosi-oa-Tunya National Park, near Livingstone

The Mulobezi Railway (once known as the Zambezi Sawmills Railway) was constructed to carry timber from Mulobezi to Livingstone in the Southern Province of Zambia, when the country was Northern Rhodesia. The line uses the 1,067 mm (3 ft 6 in) narrow gauge, also known as 'Cape gauge', shared by all main line railways in Southern Africa.

== Zambezi Sawmills ==
The first railway had been built in the country in 1904–1905 between Livingstone and Kalomo and was connected to Southern Rhodesia via the Victoria Falls Bridge, opened in 1905.

The Zambezi Sawmills company was founded in 1916 to exploit forests of Rhodesian Teak on the north bank of the Zambezi above Livingstone. The timber is hard and strong and termite-resistant and found a ready market for railway sleepers, parquet floors and door and window frames in all parts of Britain's Rhodesian colonies (including what is now Zimbabwe). The timber was dragged to the river by oxen and transported by barge downstream to a point near Livingstone from where it was hauled the few kilometres to the town in wagons running on wooden rails drawn by traction engines modified so that the front wheels ran on the tracks and the large power wheels ran outside them.

== Construction of the line ==
By the early 1920s the forests near the river were used up. They extended three hundred kilometres north-west and so the railway was constructed into them from 1923 or 1924 onwards using wrought iron rails which had originally been used for the first railway in southern Africa, the 1861 Cape Town–Wellington line. From Livingstone, where it branches off the Bulawayo–Livingstone–Lusaka main line, the branch line extends about 166 km northwest to Mulobezi.

== Rolling stock ==
British-built steam locomotives were purchased from Rhodesia Railways (4-8-0 Class VII, VIII and X) in 1924–1926. They were converted to burn sawmill waste. As well as wagons to carry the timber, some passenger coaches were built to carry employees and their families.

== Extension to Kataba ==
The line was extended 120 kilometres (75 mi) beyond Mulobezi to Kataba, with many branches into the logging areas, so that all together the railway was claimed to be the longest private railway in the world.

== Operations ==
=== Steam era ===
From the 1930s to the 1960s, one train per day ran in each direction, every day except Sundays. Journey time was 8 hours Livingstone to Mulobezi and 7 hours Mulobezi to Kataba.

=== Present day ===
Currently, one mixed train (carriages and wagons) runs per week. The railway is listed on the RailTracker website as operational between Livingstone and Mulobezi, with 9 intermediate stations. In Livingstone it connects to the Zambia Railways network. Furthermore, a working train is visible on the line on Google Earth — see the reference for coordinates.

According to an early 2012 report, it takes about 2 days for a train to make the 163 kilometres (101 mi) distance from Livingstone to Mulobezi. Due to the track conditions, the speed limit on the line is 15 kilometres (9.3 mi) an hour. About 200 passengers, as well as some livestock travel on an average train. Despite the low speed, the rail service was still in demand by the local residents, especially during the rainy season, when local roads are impassable.

== David Shepherd ==
The British artist and conservationist David Shepherd made a well-known painting of a Mulobezi steam locomotive and when the railway ceased working in the early seventies, Kenneth Kaunda, then President of Zambia, gave two of the locomotives to him. One of those, the Mulobezi Princess is kept at the Railway Museum, Livingstone where it has been restored to working order. The other locomotive Shepherd transported, together with a passenger coach, to the United Kingdom, and a documentary film of that journey was broadcast in 1976 by BBC Television, called Last Train to Mulobezi. He donated the passenger car to the National Railway Museum, the world's largest, in York. Other steam locomotives and old rolling stock lie rusting away at Mulobezi.

== See also ==
- History of rail transport in Zambia
- Rail transport in Zambia
- Railway Museum (Zambia)
