= Railway stations in Botswana =

List of Railway stations in Botswana include:

== Towns served by rail ==
=== Existing ===
- Ramatlhabama, South Africa - border with South Africa
- Lobatse
- Gaborone - national capital
- Palapye - junction for coal branch
- Serule - junction
- Francistown
- Ramokgwebana - border with Zimbabwe
- Palapye - junction
  - Morupule - branch terminus
- Serule - junction
  - Selibe Phikwe - branch terminus
- Francistown - junction
  - Sowa - branch terminus

=== Proposed ===
==== To Namibia ====
- Trans-Kalahari Railway to Namibia - Construction starting 2025 1,600 km.
  - Aranos - new coal mine
- Palapye - linked to Bulawayo in Zimbabwe
- (Botswana) Francistown
- (South Africa) Mafeking
- Lobatse

- Kang in Botswana
- Ghanzi, possible copper-silver mine.
- Morupule Colliery in east central Botswana

- (Namibia) Mariental
- (Namibia) Maltahohe
- Shearwater Bay, Namibia - port
- Aus in Namibia

==== To Mozambique ====
- via South Africa or via Zimbabwe
- Gaborone to Maputo

- Serule, Botswana via Zimbabwe to (Mozambique) Maputo (Newport)

==== To Zambia ====
- Botswana - Zambia - Kazungula bridge - 2010

== Maps ==
- UNHCR Atlas Map

== See also ==
- Transport in Botswana
- Botswana Railways
