= Mosetse–Kazungula–Livingstone Railway =

Proposed rail line in southern Africa

Locations of Livingstone, Kazungula Bridge, and Mosetse

The Mosetse–Kazungula–Livingstone Railway is a prospected 430 kilometres (270 mi) cape gauge international railway connecting the Botswana railway network at Mosetse, Botswana with the Zambian railway network at Livingstone, Zambia over the new Kazungula Bridge on the Zambezi River.

The railway line will offer a direct railway transport route of goods and people between the two countries, as well between Democratic Republic of the Congo and Zambia to the port of Durban in South Africa, being an alternative to the existing route through Zimbabwe. The completion of the combined railway and road bridge over the Zambezi and the new railway link is supposed to allow for swifter transport of goods and people in the Southern African region.

== Route ==
In Botswana the new line will branch off the existing Francistown–Sua Pan railway line at the village of Mosetse in the Central District, some 115 km northwest of Francistown. It is not known if the existing line to Francistown needs upgrading to allow for the proposed increase in railway transports.

It is prospected that the railway will follow a nearly straight northern direction along the A3 road from Mosetse to Nata, Botswana and then along the A33 highway between Nata and Kazungula on the south bank of the Zambezi river, a distance of 367 km. This stretch will also involve 22 bridges & 17 level crossings. It will then pass the 923 metre long Kazungula Bridge directly from Botswana to Zambia. On the Zambian side of the Zambezi river, a 60 km railway line in eastern direction along the M10 road to Livingstone is required to connect to the Cape to Cairo Railway.
