= Trans-Kalahari Railway =

Planned railway line in Namibia and Botswana

The Trans-Kalahari Railway is a planned railway line that will connect the port city of Walvis Bay in Namibia to Gaborone, the capital of Botswana. This proposed railway line aims to improve regional trade and economic development by providing a more efficient and cost-effective transportation route for goods being exported from Botswana, Namibia, and Southern Africa more generally.

The railway will expand freight capacity on congested transport corridors within the Southern African Development Community (SADC). It is also expected to provide greater access to global markets for other landlocked countries in the region like Malawi, Zambia, and Zimbabwe, as well as allow for a more unified trade network between South Africa and the rest of Southern Africa.

== History ==
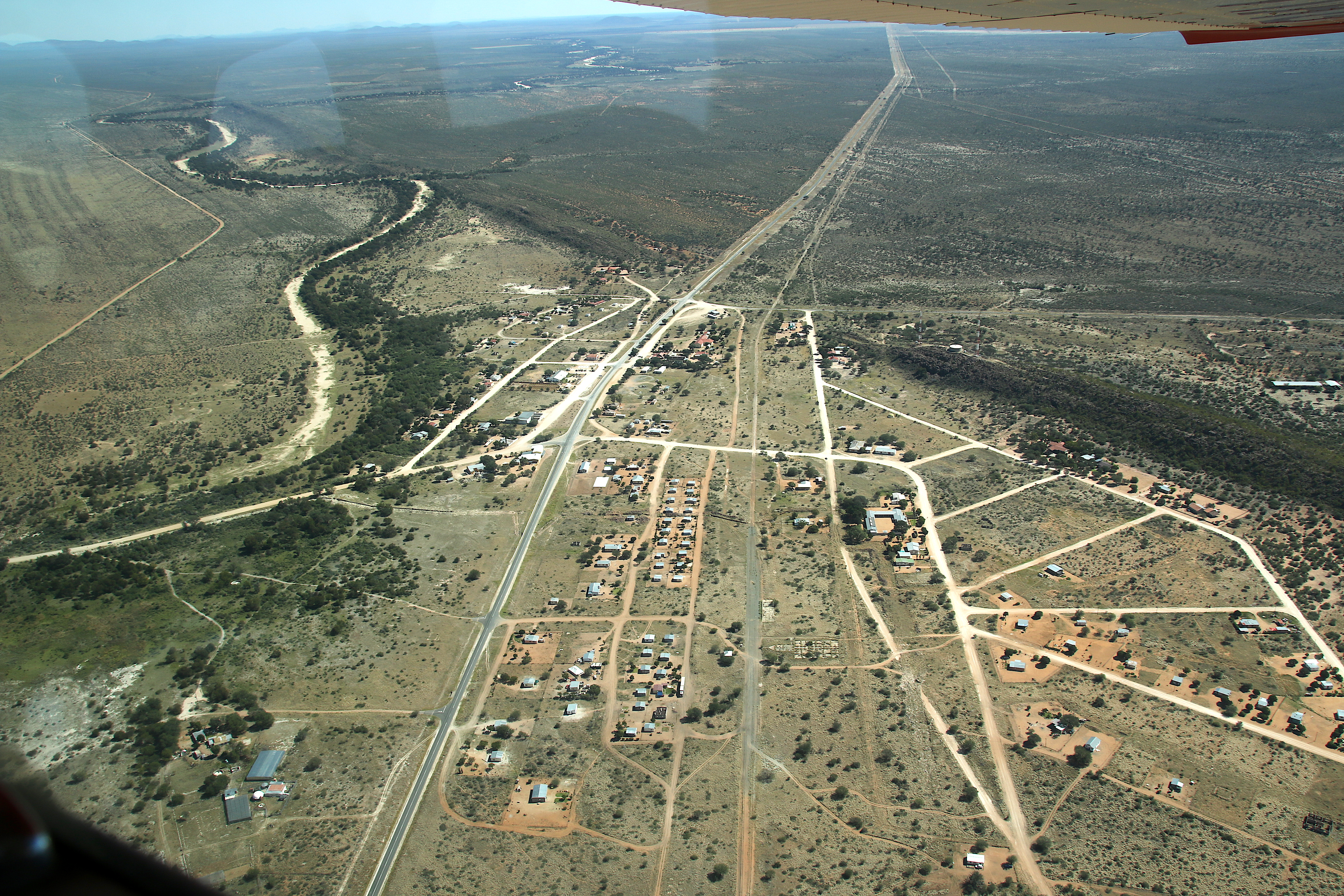
A westward view of the town centre of Witvlei in Namibia, located on the B6 national road which is part of the Trans-Kalahari Highway. The railway in the photo is part of the line to Gobabis, which the Trans-Kalahari Railway will connect to.

The concept of a Trans-Kalahari Railway has been discussed for a number of decades. Starting in 2008, the Botswanan government requested technical assistance from the Public Private Infrastructure Advisory Facility (PPIAF) to conduct a pre-feasibility study of the Trans-Kalahari Railway which would connect eastern Botswana and port facilities at Walvis Bay or at Lüderitz on Namibia’s Atlantic coast. The PPIAF helped fund the study, which recommended the Mmamabula-Walvis Bay rail route as the most cost-effective option due to its shorter distance, easier terrain, and minimal construction needs. Walvis Bay port was chosen over Lüderitz due to the high costs associated with the latter's rail route, including tunneling and environmental challenges. The study also stated that the project would not succeed without public funding, but proposed that a Public Private Partnership (PPP) would be the best financial option.

In 2010, the Governments of Namibia and Botswana had signed a Memorandum of Understanding about the project stating their intent for a new rail route between the two countries.

In August 2011 the Botswana government signed a $400 million loan agreement with the Organization of Petroleum Exporting Countries Fund for International Development for the implementation of the project, including the financing of complementary studies for the Trans-Kalahari Railway, and two additional corridors (Mmamabula–Ellisras, and Mosetse–Kazungula). It was also announced that the government was looking for a bidder for the construction of the 1,500 kilometer, $9 billion Trans-Kalahari Railway rail link. According to the Botswana Ministry of Transport and Communications, the construction of the railway was expected to be completed by 2017.

In 2015, the Governments of Namibia and Botswana signed an agreement about the route of the project, as well as the details of port facilities at Walvis Bay. The route will follow the path of the already existing Trans-Kalahari Corridor (TKC) highway, and the port will include a dry-bulk terminal and a five-berth coal terminal. At the meeting, a source named Hangula-Paulino stated that the railway will follow the TKC past Gobabis to Omitara, west to Okahandja, and onwards to Walvis Bay. In Botswana, the line shall start at the Mmamabula coal fields connecting to the existing railway to Rasesa, going west and passing north of Molepolole and east of Letlhakeng, joining the Molepolole-Kang road and through to the Mamuno border post.

In 2019, the two governments met again to discuss the project. Originally predicted to have been operational by 2017 and taking just 5 years for construction, the project was left abandoned until it was revived in a meeting by both presidents.

In 2021, the Parliamentary Committee on Statutory Bodies and State Enterprises in Botswana (PCSB&SE) expressed concern to the Botswana Railways (BR) over the delayed implementation of the railway project, stating that the original timeline for the railway had been totally abandoned, that previous state agreements were being ignored.

In 2022, the two nations reiterated their commitment to the project, and in 2023, transport officials from Namibia and Botswana met for a special joint ministerial committee (JMC) meeting on the project. John Mutorwa and his counterpart from Botswana, Eric Molale, both attended and co-chaired the JMC in Windhoek and stated that an Expression of Interest (EOI) would run from 6 September to 8 November 2023, followed by a pre-qualification stage between December 2023 and February 2024. This will then be followed by Requests for Proposals (RFP) for three months from March 2024, with the development or construction stage to commence in January 2025.

During the 2023 meeting, Eric Molale also stated that the project was now more necessary than ever, as Transnet "struggles to ship goods" and so was holding back Botswana's economy.

In 2024, there was another JMC on the rail project as transport leaders in from both nations. The meeting agreed for a new consult company be found for what the technical details of a construction bid should be, as well as a new feasibility study be carried out. There was also agreement that the timeline may be pushed back.

== Route and Capacity ==
Locations of Walvis Bay, Mmamabula, and Gaborone

The railway is expected to mostly be a freight haulage line due to the path focusing on connecting industry rather than population centres. The line is predominantly aimed for coal transport from the Mmamabula coal fields to the Walvis Bay port, with an estimate that it would be exporting 90 million tonnes of coal each year from Botswana to India and China.

The route will follow the Trans-Kalahari Corridor (TKC) highway past Gobabis to Omitara, west to Okahandja, and onwards to Walvis Bay. In Botswana, the line shall start at the Mmamabula coal fields connecting to the existing railway to Rasesa, going west and passing north of Molepolole and east of Letlhakeng, joining the Molepolole-Kang road and through to the Mamuno border post.

The route is supposed to better connect the Botswanan rail network to Namibia's rail network, but also connect Namibia through to Botswana's rail routes to Zambia, Zimbabwe, and South Africa.
