= Rail transport in Tanzania =

Railway network 1,000 mm (3 ft 3 3/8 in) gauge, 1,067 mm (3 ft 6 in) gauge

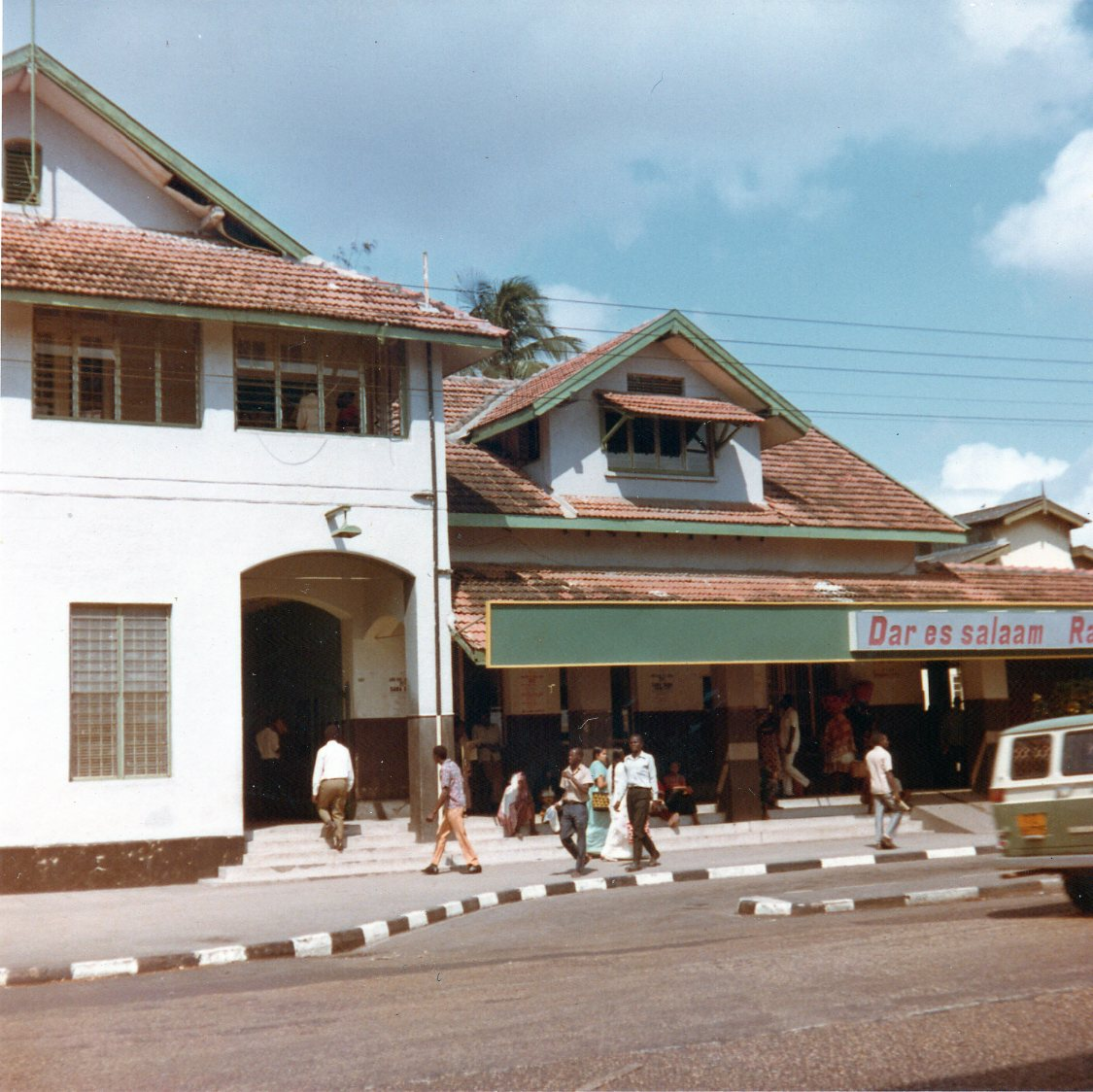
Dar es Salaam railway station in 1973.

Rail transport in Tanzania is run by two companies (Tanzania Railways Corporation and TAZARA). It has historically used narrow (metre) gauge trackage, but planning and construction of new standard gauge lines is underway as of 2025.

== Railway links with adjacent countries ==
- Burundi - no - proposed 1,435 mm (4 ft 8 1/2 in) as part of SGR project.
- (Democratic Republic of the Congo) DR Congo - decades ago there was a train ferry between Kigoma and Kalemie, in 2007 there are no ferry links and the DR Congo line to Kalemie is defunct because of a collapsed bridge. Break of gauge: 1,000 mm (3 ft 3 3/8 in)/1,067 mm (3 ft 6 in). Proposed 1,435 mm (4 ft 8 1/2 in) as part of SGR project.
- Kenya - no, historically present - 1,000 mm (3 ft 3 3/8 in) same gauge, but the link between Moshi and Voi is defunct due to rails being lifted during A103 road renovation near Voi.
- Malawi - no - break of gauge 1,000 mm (3 ft 3 3/8 in)/1,067 mm (3 ft 6 in)
- Mozambique - no - break of gauge 1,000 mm (3 ft 3 3/8 in)/1,067 mm (3 ft 6 in)
- Rwanda - no - proposed 1,435 mm (4 ft 8 1/2 in) as part of SGR project.
- Uganda - yes - same gauge - via train ferry from Mwanza to Port Bell or Jinja.
- Zambia - yes - break of gauge 1,000 mm (3 ft 3 3/8 in)/1,067 mm (3 ft 6 in)

The central line between Kigoma and Dar es Salaam carries international freight and passengers in transit from Burundi, DR Congo and Rwanda to the Indian Ocean, and the branch from Tabora to Mwanza carries freight and passengers between Uganda and the Indian Ocean. →

== Standard gauge development ==
On 31 March 2015 the Tanzanian government announced it would use $14.2 billion of commercial loans to build new rail infrastructure across the country before 2021, and make the country a regional transport hub. In June, China Railway Materials was awarded a $7.6 billion contract, primarily funded by commercial financing, to build new standard gauge lines connecting Dar es Salaam with Burundi and Rwanda. A separate $1.4 billion contract was awarded to China Railway Engineering Corporation to build a line between mines near Ludewa and the port of Mtwara. Both Chinese contracts were terminated by President John Magufuli when he took office in November 2015.

In February 2017, construction companies Yapı Merkezi and Mota-Engil were jointly awarded a contract to build 207 kilometres (129 mi) of track between Dar es Salaam and Morogoro, and a 400-kilometre (250 mi) line connecting Isaka with Burundi and Rwanda. Construction of the Dar es Salaam–Morogoro line began in April 2017. The new line is designed to allow passenger services to travel at up to 160 km/h (100 mph) and freight services at up to 120 km/h (75 mph). Tanzania plans to extend the line to Dodoma, and later to Kigoma and Mwanza, contingent on obtaining financing. The Dar es Salaam–Morogoro section was completed in April 2022.

== Proposed line ==
- Lobito-Dar es Salaam Railway

== See also ==
- East African Railway Master Plan
- History of rail transport in Tanzania
- Tanzania
- Transport in Tanzania
- AIHSRN
