= Technobanine Point =

Coordinates: 26°41′00″S 32°53′59″E

Technobanine Point is the site of a proposed deepwater port in Mozambique near the capital Maputo.

== Transport ==
It would be connected by an 1100 km long railway line to coal mines in Botswana and also Zimbabwe.

== See also ==
- Railway stations in Mozambique
- Railway stations in Zimbabwe
- Railway stations in Botswana
- List of deepwater ports
