= Rail transport in Zambia =

Rail transport in Zambia is primarily provided by two operators:

- TAZARA Railway
- Zambia Railways Limited

See the linked articles for history, service updates and sources.

== Railway links with adjacent countries ==
- Democratic Republic of the Congo - Ndola to Sakania then Lubumbashi - 1,067 mm (3 ft 6 in), freight only.
- Angola - no direct link - but indirectly via DR Congo to the Benguela Railway, part of the Lobito Corridor - same gauge 1,067 mm (3 ft 6 in). In October 2023, Zambia signed a Memorandum of Understanding with Angola, DR Congo, the United States and the European Union for the construction of a new railway line connecting the Zambian Copperbelt via northwestern Zambia directly to the Benguela Railway at Luacano in eastern Angola. The project, named Zambia-Lobito railway, is supported by the African Development Bank and the Africa Finance Corporation.
- Tanzania - from Kapiri Mposhi, border crossing at Nakonde, Zambia, to Dar es Salaam, TAZARA railway, passenger and freight - 1,067 mm (3 ft 6 in)
- Malawi - Chipata-Mchinji opened 2014, closed 2016, see Zambia Railways Limited for updates.
- Mozambique - no direct link, but indirectly to Nacala, Beira (via Malawi, see above) and Maputo (via Zimbabwe, no continuous passenger services).
- Zimbabwe - from Livingstone via the Victoria Falls Bridge to Bulawayo, freight only.
- Botswana - no direct link, indirectly via Zimbabwe (no continuous passenger services). A new line has been proposed (Mosetse–Kazungula–Livingstone Railway) crossing the Zambezi River via the Kazangula Bridge.
- Namibia - no direct link.

== See also ==
- East African Railway Master Plan
- Economy of Zambia
- Railway
- Lobito–Dar es Salaam Railway
