= Techobanine =

Techobanine is a coastal village in Mozambique.

== Transport ==
In 2011, an agreement was signed between Mozambique and Botswana for the construction of a deepwater port.

== See also ==
- Technobanine Point
