= Mulobezi =

- Location in Zambia
- Coordinates: 16°46′56″S 25°10′22″E
- Country: Zambia
- Admin. division: Southern Province
- Elevation: 3,202 ft (976 m)
- Climate: Cwa

Mulobezi is a small town in the Western Province of Zambia, and the centre of its timber industry. Timber extends into Southern Province with which the town is economically linked.

Extensive forests of Zambian Teak grow on the sandy soils of the southwest part of Southern Province and the southeast part of Western Province. To extract the timber, the Mulobezi Railway was built from Livingstone in the 1920s, and once extended beyond Mulobezi to the northwest. Today, commercially viable stocks of the slow-growing teak trees are virtually used up and the timber industry is a shadow of its former self.

== Transport ==
The railway still operates a weekly service from Livingstone with Mulobezi as the terminus.

== See also ==
- Transport in Zambia
