= Morupule =

Village in Botswana

- Village
- Interactive map of Morupule
- Coordinates: 22°30′47″S 27°01′26″E
- Country: Botswana
- District: Central

Population
  - Total: 22

Morupule is a small town in the Central District of Botswana. It had a population of 28 in the 2022 Census.

The coal-fired Morupule Thermal Power Station is located nearby. It generated about 30% of the country's electric power in 2006. Coal for the power station is supplied by the nearby Morupule Colliery.

It is outside of Palapye town next to the main road from Gaborone. It is serviced by a station on the national railway network. It also has an airstrip.

== See also ==
- Railway stations in Botswana
