= Lobito–Dar es Salaam Railway =

Railway line in Eastern, Central and Southern Africa

Overview
- Status: Planned
- Locale: Angola, Zambia and Tanzania
- Termini: Lobito, Angola; Dar es Salaam, Tanzania

Service
- Type: Heavy rail

History
- Opened: 1 January 2030 (Expected)

Technical
- Line length: 3,960 km (2,460 mi)
- Track gauge: 1,067 mm (3 ft 6 in)
- Operating speed: 90 km/h (56 mph)
- Highest elevation: 6,082 ft (1,854 m)

The Lobito–Dar es Salaam Railway is a planned narrow gauge railway line that connects the Angolan port city of Lobito to the Tanzanian port city of Dar es Salaam, through the Zambian city of Kapiri Mposhi. It is an African transcontinental railroad connecting the Atlantic and Indian oceans and it is financed by China. The initiative is planned in tandem with the country's US$10 billion standard-gauge railway infrastructure development, to help Tanzania secure port business from Rwanda, Burundi, Uganda, and the Democratic Republic of Congo (DRC).

== Location ==
The railway line would start in Lobito, in Benguela Province, on the coast of the Atlantic Ocean, approximately 510 kilometres (317 mi) south of Luanda, the capital city of Angola.

From Lobito, the line would travel eastwards, cross into Zambia, to the city of Kapiri Mposhi, an estimated 2,100 kilometres (1,305 mi) from Lobito. From there, the railway line would continue eastwards towards the Indian Ocean coast, as the existing Tazara Railway that measures 1,860 kilometres (1,160 mi), whose eastern terminus is the port of Dar es Salaam in Tanzania.

== Overview ==
The justification for this railway line is to promote exports of the three countries, through which the railway passes, to the continents of Europe, the Americas and Asia. The line would also increase tourism into those three countries, in addition to creating jobs and improving local economies.

The railway link would also allow the distribution of imported goods from overseas into the three African countries, as well as promote intra-African trade, among those countries.

== Way forward ==
The government of Angola is prepared to spearhead the efforts to build the Lobito-Kapiri Mposhi section of the railway line and is looking upon Zambia and Tanzania to harmonize the integration of the new construction with the existing Tazara Railway. No timelines have been made public, as of December 2020.

== See also ==
- History of rail transport in Angola
- Benguela Railway
- Rail transport in Angola
- TAZARA
