= Railway Museum (Livingstone, Zambia) =

Coordinates: 17°51′45.0″S 25°50′53.7″E

Railway Museum Livingstone, Zambia
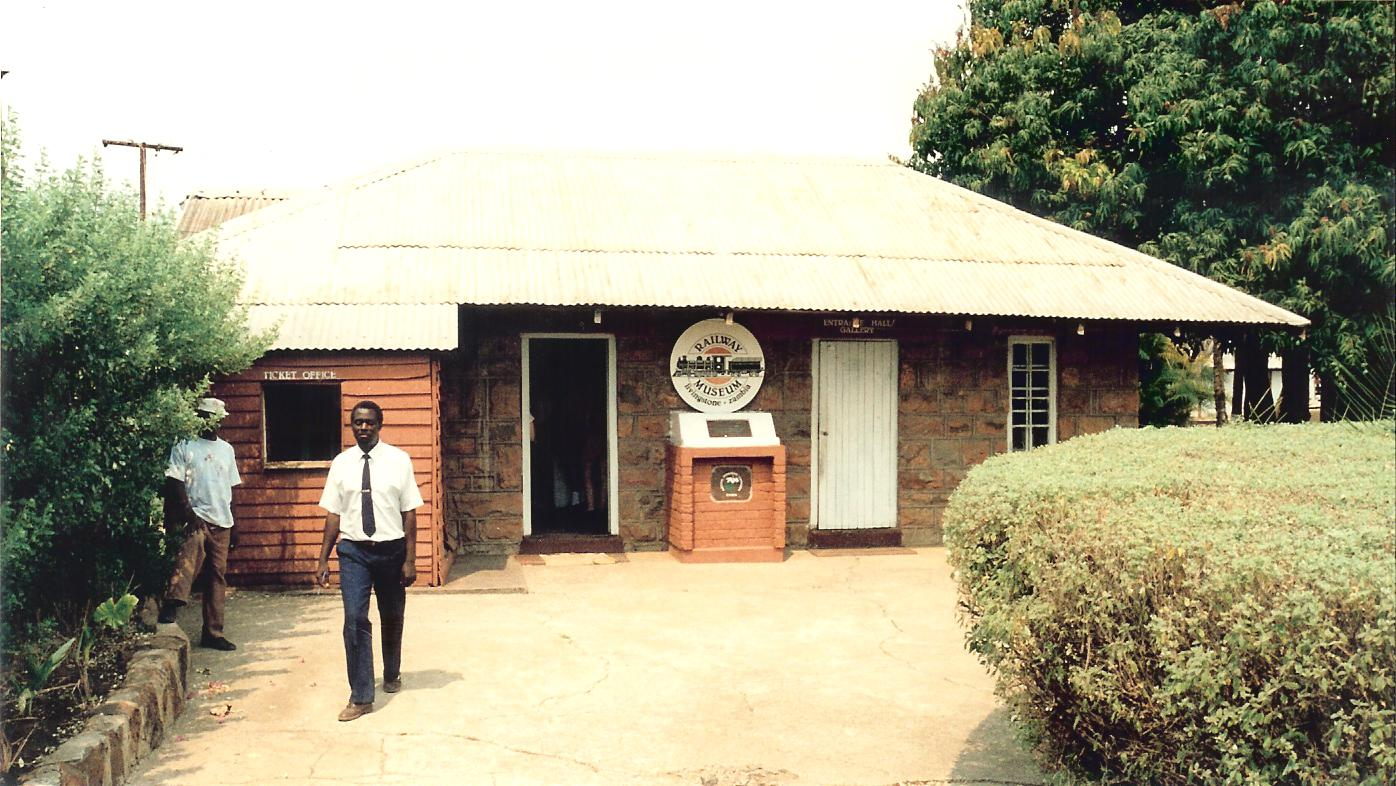
- Museum entrance, September 1997.

- Location within Zambia
- Location: Chishimba Falls Road; Livingstone; Zambia
- Type: Railway museum

The Railway Museum is a museum in Livingstone, Zambia, dedicated to preserving Zambia's railway heritage, as well as holding an exhibition on the history of Jews in Zambia.

== See also ==
- Bibliography of the history of Zambia
