= Serule =

Village in Botswana

Coordinates: 21°55′24″S 27°19′15″E

Location of Serule

Serule is a village in Central District of Botswana. Serule, with a latitude of -21.95 (21° 56' 60 S) and a longitude of 27.3 (27° 18' 0 E), is a streets, highways, roads, or railroad (railroad siding). The village is located along the road between Francistown and Palapye, and is an important railroad junction with rails leading towards north to Francistown, south to Palapye and east to the mining town of Selebi-Phikwe, 72 km from Palapye north up the A1 road, 88 km from Francistown down south the A1 road and 60 km west of Selibe Phikwe to the T-junction. The location is situated 340 kilometres east (90°) of the approximate centre of Botswana and 332 kilometres north east (26°) of the capital Gaborone.

== Demographics ==
The population according to the 2001 census was 2,268 and it is estimated at more than 3000 in the latest 2011 census. The people of Serule Village comprises different ethnicities namely Bangwato, Bakwena, Batalaote, Bakalanga, Bahurutshe and its six wards are Mothoathubega, Borotsi, Mokwena, Botalaote, Basimaneng and Leupane. A 100 square km area around Serule has an approximate population of 1515 (0.000015 persons per square meter) and an average elevation of 993 meters above the sea.

== Politics and government ==
The chieftaincy of the village is headed by Kgosi Oletile Modisa, a Motalaote who took over in 2001 from the then chief Tau Lesego. Oletile Modisa is the elder son of the village founding father Kgosi Gabana. Kgosi Modisa is assisted by Kgosi Mmese. The newly formed ward Mothoathubega is developing quite drastically with modern houses being erected.

The people of Serule are conservative and the majority of the village tend to lean towards the ruling Botswana Democratic Party. The Botswana National Front's presence in the village died following the birth of the Botswana Congress Party which continues to be the other party present in the village although without much following.

The Councillor of Serule is Titty Freddy under the ticket of the main opposition Umbrella for Democratic Change. Former Councillor Seno Fane Mokhondo is a recipient of the 2006 Presidential Certificate of Honour. The Presidential Certificate of Honour is described as “a certificate awarded for long and faithful service to Botswana.” The country's current Minister of Defense, Security and Justice is the village's representative at Botswana National Assembly in the Serowe North East Constituency, under the ruling party. Previous legislators who have represented Serule include former president Festus Gontebanye Mogae and former cabinet minister Lephimotswe Boyce Sebetlela.

Baratiwa Mathoothe of the opposition Botswana Patriotic Front is the Member of Parliament for Serowe North Constituency which covers Serule village. He grabbed the constituency from BDP's Kgotla Kenneth Autlwetse at the October 2019 General Election. It was the first time in history the village fell into opposition leadership.

== Infrastructural development ==
Although Serule is a small village with a small population, over the past decades there have been significant growth in terms of infrastructural development. The housing system is evidently almost at par with urban and modern houses. Much of the amenities that can be seen in other parts of Botswana and urban places are present in Serule. Botswana's Number 10 Police Commanding District is situated in Serule. Also in the village are Little Tomy Day Care Centre, Serule Primary School, Bonwatlou Junior School, Serule Clinic, a post office. Its strategic position along the country's main A1 road has led to the establishment of the Weight Bridge for trucks and other big vehicles in the early 2000s. The village also enjoys a significant kilometres of tarred roads within. Also present is the Majoje monument, situated in the Majoje hills which is like a museum of the village.

The village also host the Botswana Animal Information Traceability System (BAITS Cafe) operated by Imparo Holdings, a 100% citizen and youth owned company. It is also host to the Mascom Kitsong Centre which serves as some sort of information and service hub for the communications company Mascom Wireless.

== Economy ==
The people of Serule Village are mostly farmers and depend much on agriculture although there is a significant number of people who eke out a living from both formal and informal employment within the village and outside in urban areas. A majority of them practise subsistence farming. They own livestock in cattle posts of Makgorwane, Libu, Xomexhwa, and Seokane. Majoje lands are the most common place for the natives where they until the land for agricultural production.

Small scale manufacturing for household items is also evident as well as traces of handicrafts and wood carvings. There is a high rate of harvesting of the seasonal caterpillar of a Mopane worm known as Phane (scientific name Gonimbrasia belina). Phane is an important source of protein for millions of indigenous Southern Africans and a valuable source of income where it is sold after being harvested, cooked and dried.

In 2007, BSE-listed A-Cap Resources, which has a prospecting licence covering 4, 500 square kilometres in the area, has announced the discovery of new uranium deposits in Serule Village, where drilling began in 2008. The company announced 158 million pounds of uranium in November 2009. Uranium as a low CO_{2} energy source is currently controversial after the Fukushima disaster.

== See also ==
- Railway stations in Botswana
