= Mosetse =

Village in Botswana

Coordinates: 20°38′22″S 26°38′23″E

Location of Mosetse

Mosetse is a village in Central District of Botswana. It is located along the road from Francistown to Nata. The population was 1,661 at the time of the 2001 census. Mosetse lies along the Mosetse River, which ultimately empties into the Sua Pan, a part of the Makgadikgadi Pan.

The village lies on the Francistown–Sua Pan railway line, at which point the proposed Mosetse–Kazungula–Livingstone Railway will branch off.
