= Mmamabula =

Infrastructure project in Botswana

- Country: Botswana
- Coordinates: 23.609295°S 26.774952°E
- Status: Planned
- Owner: Jindal Steel and Power

Thermal power station
- Primary fuel: Coal

Power generation
- Nameplate capacity: 300 MW

Mmamabula is a planned coal mine and coal-fired power station to the east of the main road and rail corridor in Botswana between Gaborone and Francistown and south of the Serorome River. The power station would be near to the village of Mmaphashalala. It is about 130 kilometres (81 mi) north of the capital city of Gaborone.

== Coalfield ==
The Mmamabula coalfield is considered to be a western extension of the Waterberg Coalfield in the Ellisras Basin in South Africa, to the east, which contains about 40% of South Africa's coal resources. CIC Energy of Canada owned two prospecting licences in the coal field and conducted extensive exploratory drilling between 2005 and 2012. The portions of the coalfield for which CIC Energy held licences are estimated to have 2.4 billion tonnes of thermal coal of a quality suitable for export, for local power generation and for coal gasification. Deposits were roughly 360 million tonnes in the Central block, 643 million tonnes in the Western block, and 1,392 million tonnes in the Eastern block. The South block, which lies on both sides of the road and rail corridor, is estimated to hold another 311 million tonnes of coal.

== Initial mining and power plan ==
The planned Serorome coal mine would be in the Central Block, supplying 4.7 million metric sales tonnes annually for at least thirty years to the planned 1,200 MW Mmamabula power station. Open cast mining would be used for 30% of the area, and underground bord and pillar mining for the remainder. Water from the Dikgatlhong Dam, completed in 2012, was expected to supply the coalfield and power station via the North-South Carrier pipeline. In March 2009, CIC Energy announced that it had signed a contract with Shanghai Electric as contractor for engineering, procurement and construction of the Mmamabula Energy Project (MEP), with commercial operations expected to start four years after financing had been arranged. The same month CIC Energy submitted bids to Eskom of South Africa and Botswana Power Corporation to supply electricity.

South Africa had a target date to gazette their Integrated Resource Plan (IRP) by September 2010. This would lay out South Africa's strategy for meeting new energy needs from 2013 onward, assumed to include new government-owned facilities and contracts with private suppliers such as CIC Energy. South Africa said they could not commit to any Power Purchasing Agreement (PPA) with CIC before the IRP was approved. The delay would affect Botswana, which needed a portion of the plant's output to meet projected demand. The IRP was eventually completed in May 2011. It did not include any window for purchase of power from Mmamabula before 2019, and then the amounts purchased would be less than 1200 MW. CIC Energy was forced to put the project on hold after investing over C$100 million.

== Later developments ==
Early in 2011 it was reported that JSW Energy of India would take over Mmamabula. This took place in 2012. JSW Energy is a subsidiary of the Jindal Group, chaired by Sajjan Jindal. Later there was speculation that the Chinese would be in the market for the asset. However, lack of high-capacity access to port facilities would be a drawback in exporting coal. A pre-feasibility study for building infrastructure to export 10 million tonnes of coal yearly via Namibia gave estimates of US$2.5 billion for a 1,500 km new railway and US $1.1 billion for a coal terminal and new port facility in either Lüderitz or Walvis Bay. CIC Energy continued to search for a partner or purchaser. In March 2012 the Dutch energy trader Vitol Energy took a 9.1% equity stake in CIC Energy, injecting much-needed operational cash.

With CIC's license coming up for renewal, the Ministry of Minerals, Energy and Water Resources put up the Mmamabula South and Central blocks for tender in June 2012. These blocks held about 670 million tonnes of coal. Bids would be evaluated in part on how quickly the bidder would be able to start exploiting the coal field. However, in August 2012 the government decided to renew CIC's retention licence for the central block, with about 361 million tonnes of coal. A week later the Competition Authority approved a proposed takeover of CIC Energy by Jindal Steel and Power. Jindal requires large supplies of coal for its Indian steel plants. Jindal Steel and Power, chaired by Naveen Jindal, is also a subsidiary of the Jindal Group. In September 2012 it was announced that Jindal Steel and Power was completing a $116 million purchase of CIC Energy, acquiring its rights in the coalfield. Jindal said it planned to invest up to $700 million to develop a coal mine and a 300 MW power plant. It would also develop coal exports from the field, possibly via rail to Mozambique. The deal was conditional on approval by the Minister of Minerals, Energy and Water Resources.

== Controversy ==
In February 2008, David Wheeler of the Center for Global Development published a paper analyzing the carbon dioxide emissions from the Mmamabula power plant, which the World Bank was proposing to help fund. He compared the cost of power to "clean" solar thermal power, and found that a charge of about $35 per ton of carbon dioxide would make the solar alternative economical. He recommended grants from the Bank's Clean Technology Fund for such projects as an alternative to loans for further coal generation that ignored the environmental costs.
