= Botswana Railways =

National railway operator of Botswana

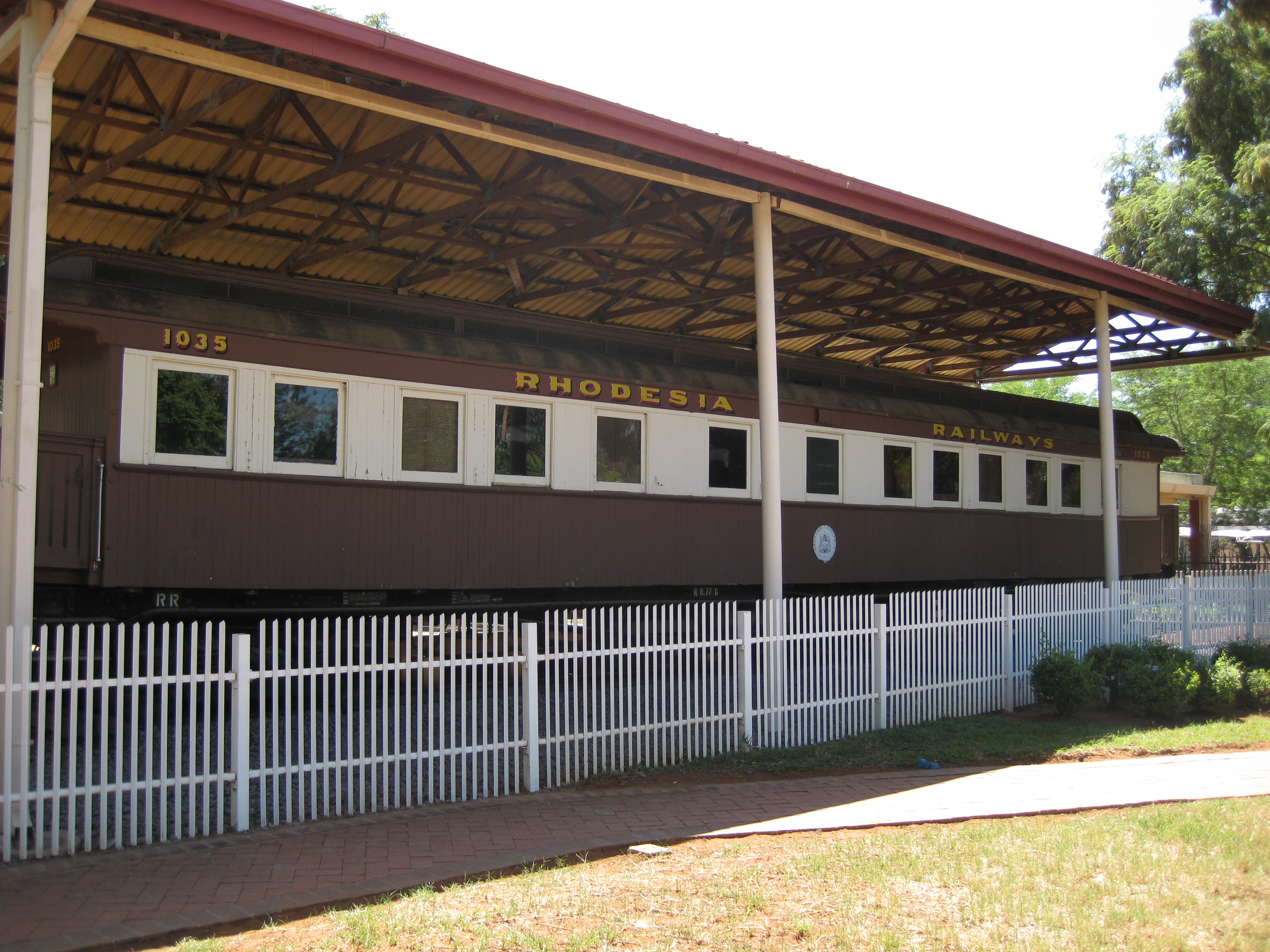
- Historic Rhodesia Railway car at the National Museum in Gaborone, Botswana

Overview
- Parent company: Government of Botswana
- Dates of operation: 1987–
- Predecessor: National Railways of Zimbabwe

Technical
- Track gauge: 3 ft 6 in (1,067 mm)
- Length: 888 kilometres (552 mi)

Botswana Railways (BR) is the national railway of Botswana.

== History ==
Botswana Railways (BR) was established in 1987 when the government of Botswana bought out the Botswana-based sections of the National Railways of Zimbabwe (NRZ). NRZ had been initially operating the rail system after Botswana had gained independence. Management of the BR is supported by RITES Ltd. of India.

The opening of the Beitbridge Bulawayo Railway in Zimbabwe in 1999 resulted in a major drop in the volume of freight transit and income. As a response the BR has been considering the construction of a direct line to Zambia (Zambia Railways), bypassing Zimbabwe, to regain income from transit.

On 27 February 2009, an announcement was made of the termination of all Botswana Railways passenger services. However, passenger trains operated by National Railways of Zimbabwe (NRZ) continued to run from Bulawayo to Lobatse via Plumtree, Francistown and Gaborone.

As of October 2010, BR was building a large shopping mall near Gaborone station, and expressed hopes that passenger services might resume, although BR could not give any concrete details.

In December 2014 Botswana Railways announced that it would purchase new passenger cars and locomotives and that passenger services would resume in late 2015. A passenger service between Gaborone and Lobatse, marketed under the name BR Express, eventually began operation in March 2016.

== Network ==
Map of the railway network of Botswana

The Botswana Railways system consists of 888 kilometres (552 mi) of 1,067 mm (3 ft 6 in) Cape gauge track. The main line runs through the south-eastern region of Botswana from Mahikeng in South Africa through Lobatse, Gaborone, Mahalapye, Palapye and Francistown to Plumtree in Zimbabwe. In addition there are three branch lines: from Palapye to Morupule Colliery, from Serule to Selebi-Phikwe, and from Francistown to Sowa.

- Main Line - 640 km
- Francistown to Sua Pan (branch line) - 174.5 km
- Palapye to Morupule Colliery (branch line) - 16 km
- Private Sidings - 50 km
- Service Sidings - 20 km
- Station Yards - 30 km
- Crossing Loops - 20 km

== Fleet ==
=== Locomotives ===
As of December 2017

- 8 GE UM22C diesel-electric locomotives, 1982
- 20 EMD GT22LC-2 diesel electric locomotives, 1986
- 10 GE U15C diesel electric locomotives, 1990
- 8 EMD GT42AC diesel electric, 2017

=== Purchase of passenger cars and locomotives ===
In December 2014 Botswana Railways announced that they would purchase three generator vans, five first class sleepers, 18 economy class coaches, five business class coaches, three buffet cars and a luggage van.

== Passenger Services ==
As of February 2026, all passenger services operated by Botswana Railways have been suspended.

== Railway links to adjacent countries ==
Botswana Railways are connected to Zimbabwe and South African lines, both using the same gauge.

There is no direct connection with Namibia, but one does exist via South Africa, although an electrified railway connecting to Lüderitz in Namibia for coal traffic was scheduled to open in 2006.

In August 2010, Mozambique and Botswana signed a memorandum of understanding to develop an 1100 km railway through Zimbabwe, to carry coal from Serule in Botswana to a deep-water port at Techobanine Point in Mozambique.

A new rail link between Botswana and Zambia, bypassing Zimbabwe, was mooted in 2005 by Botswana Railways (BR) general manager Andrew Lunga. The line was envisaged as running south-westwards from Livingstone, crossing the Zambezi, then continuing to a junction with the existing BR tracks at Mosetse. Lunga's proposal arose following the serious loss of traffic suffered by BR following the opening of the Beitbridge-Bulawayo line, after which annual BR freight tonnage fell from 1.1m per annum to about 150,000. Zimbabwe's economic problems had worsened the situation, prejudicing free traffic flow. The suggested line, Lunga pointed out, would provide important alternative routes linking South Africa, Zambia and the Democratic Republic of Congo.

== Gallery of Botswana Rail ==
Botswana Rail in Pictures

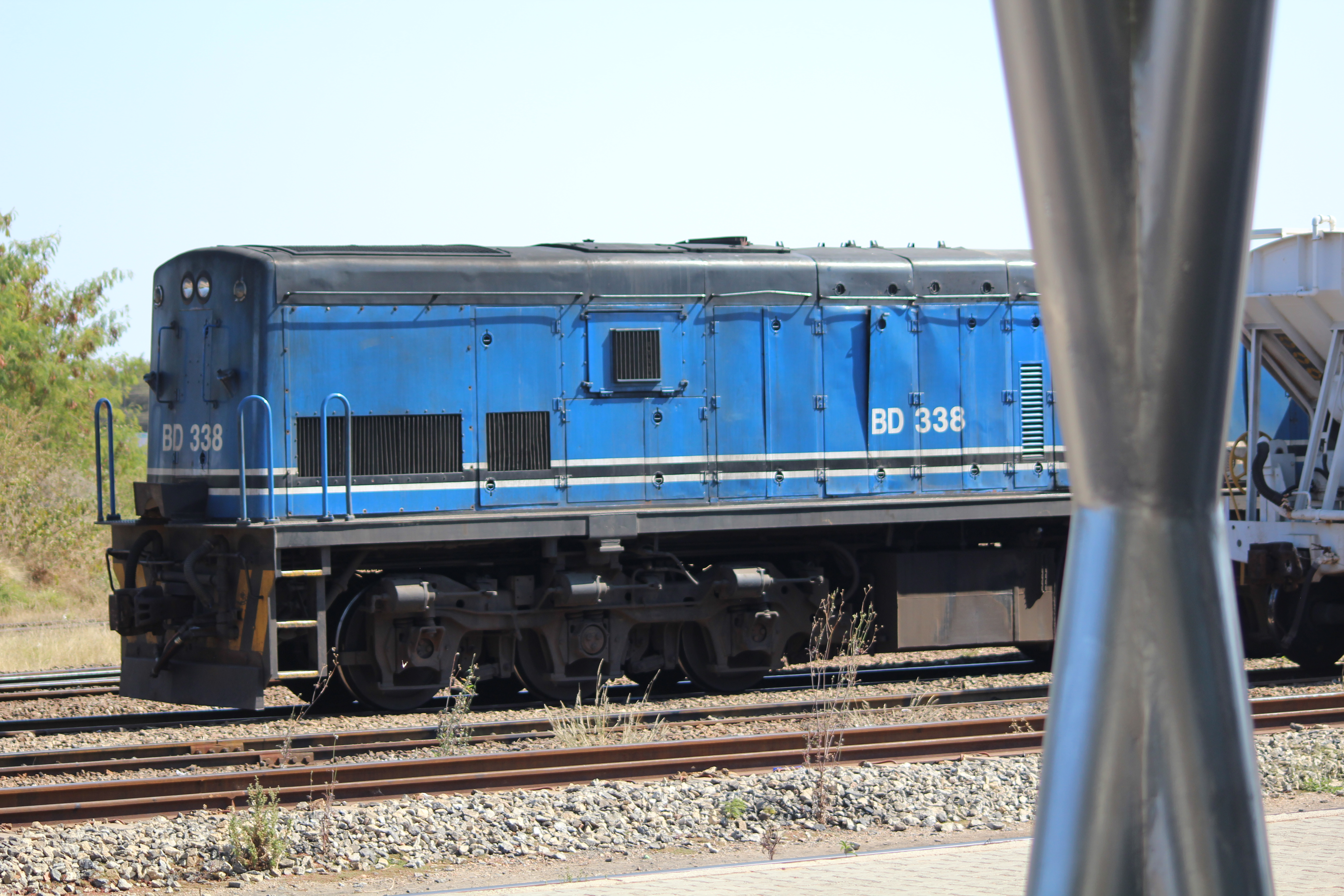
Botswana railways Train at Francistown station

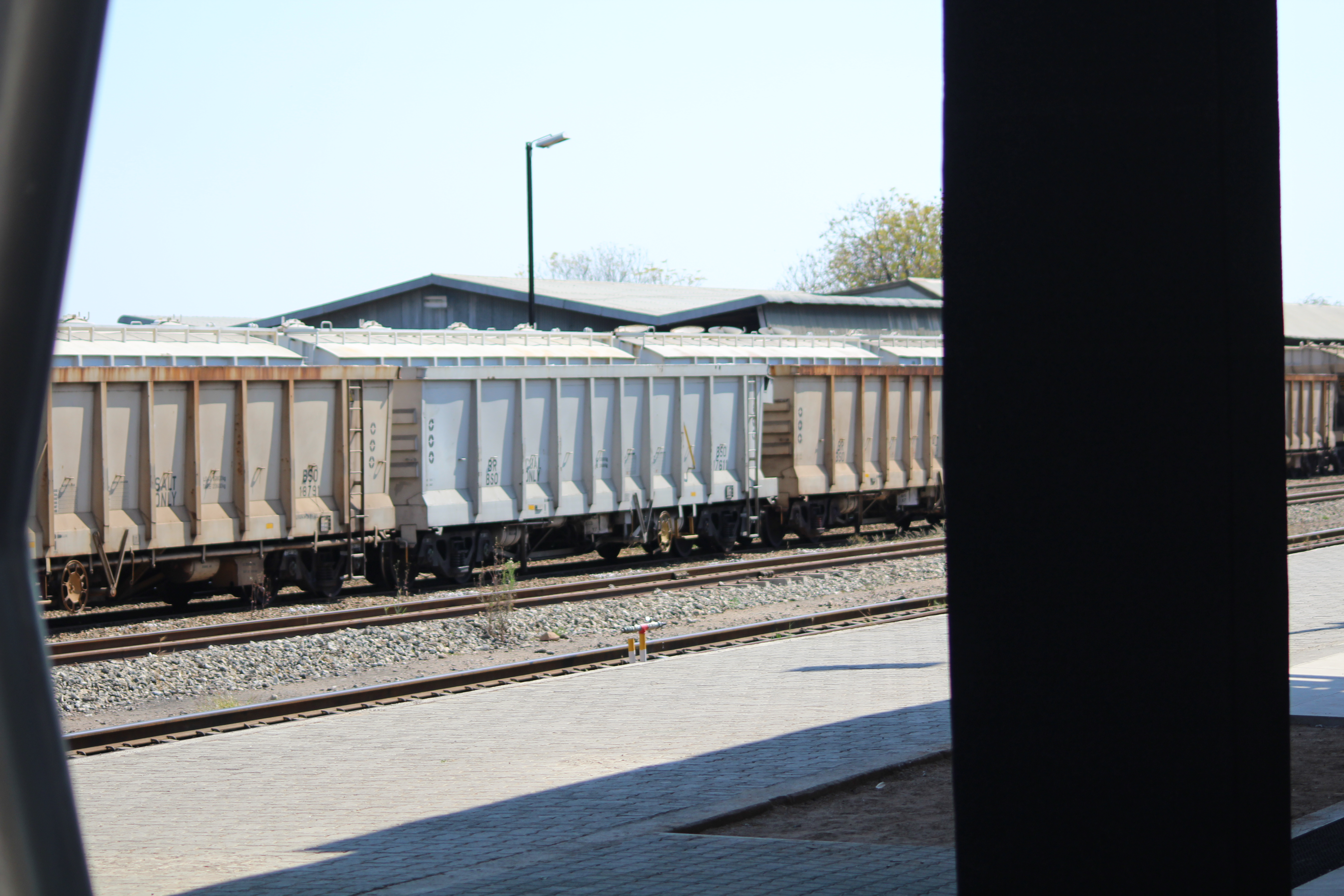
Cargo train at Francistown station

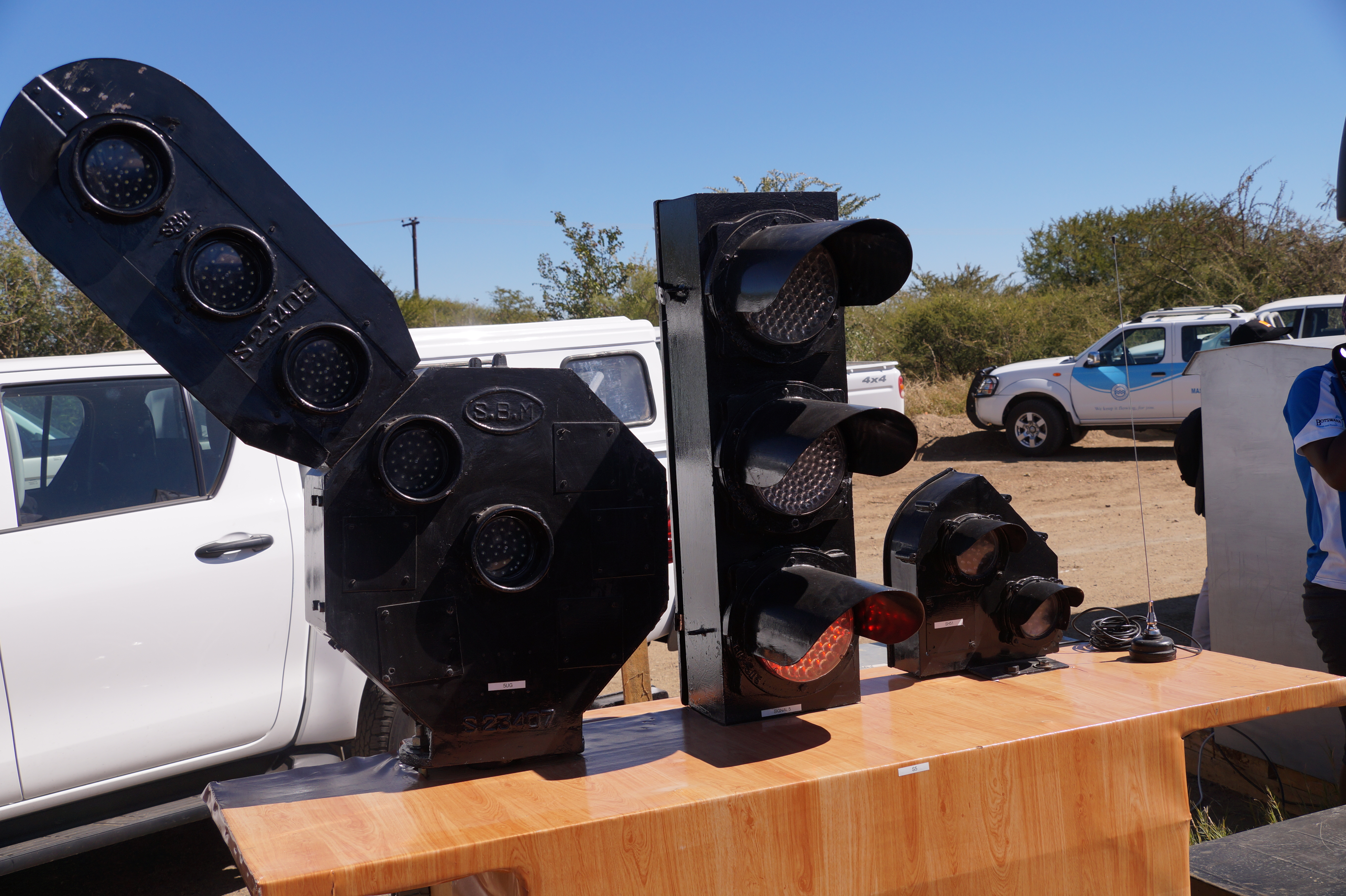
Botswana Rail showcasing their work at the World telecommunications and informations society day 2017

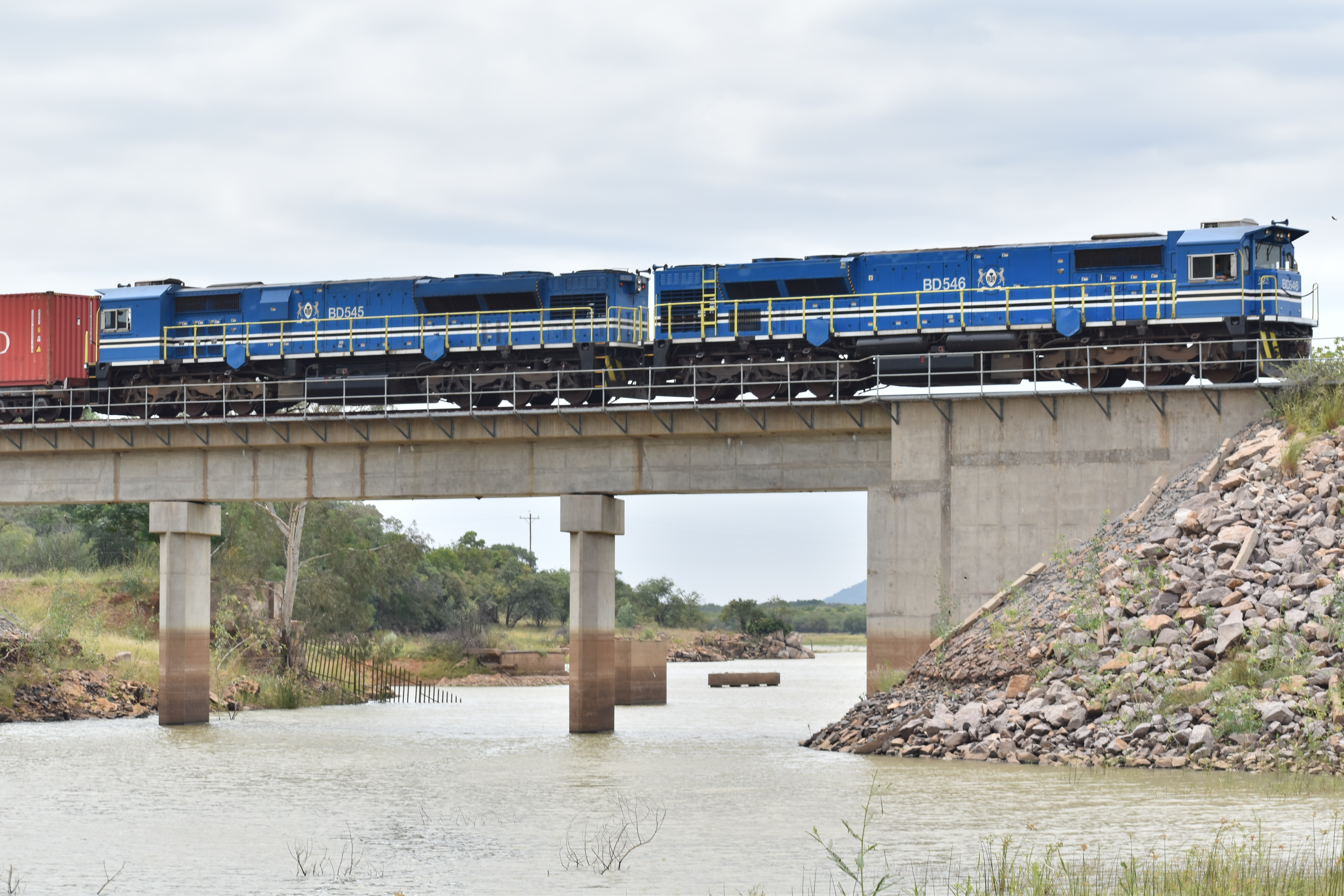
Botswana railways train passing the Notwane bridge, in Gaborone, Botswana.

== See also ==
- Transport in Botswana
- Botswana Railways Amalgamated Workers' Union
