= Outline of Botswana =

Country in Southern Africa

The flag of Botswana

The coat of arms of Botswana

The following outline provides an overview of and topical guide to Botswana. The landlocked nation located in Southern Africa is officially known as the Republic of Botswana. The nation is known for its geography which is defined by the Kalahari Desert and the Okavango Delta. Prior to independence, the nation was under the British Empire as the Bechuanaland Protectorate. It is bordered by South Africa to the south and southeast, Namibia to the west, Zambia to the north, and Zimbabwe to the northeast. The economy is dominated by mining and tourism.

== General reference ==
- Pronunciation: /bɒtˈswɑːnə/, also UK: /bʊtˈswɑːnə, bʊˈtʃwɑːnə/
- International rankings of Botswana
- Common English country name: Botswana
- Official English country name: Republic of Botswana
- Official endonym: Lefatshe la Botswana
- Adjectival: Motswana
- Demonym: Batswana
- Etymology: Land of the Tswana
- ISO country code: BW, BWA, 072
- ISO region code: See ISO 3166-2:BW
- Internet country code top-level domain: .bw

== Geography of Botswana ==
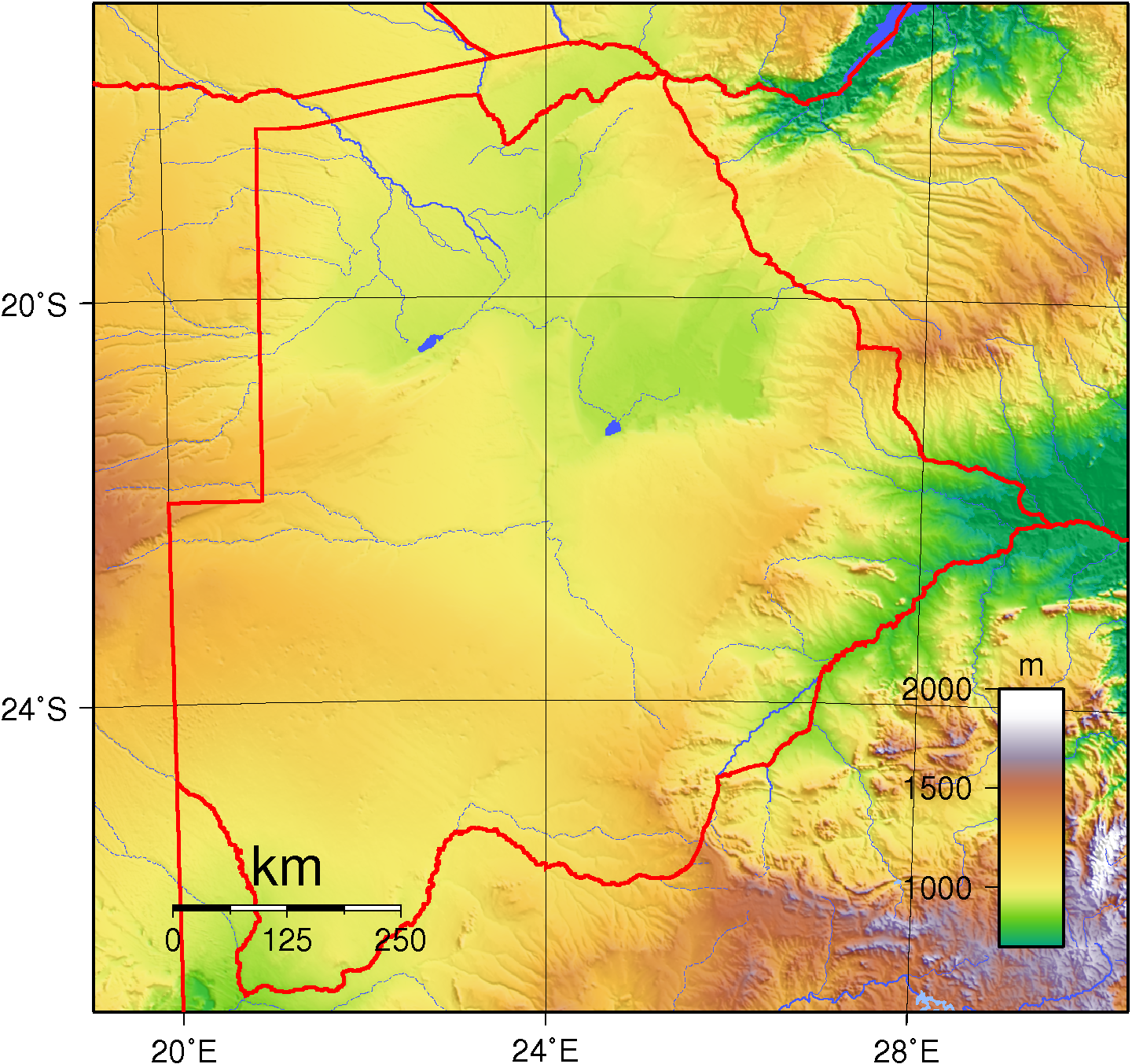
An enlargeable topographic map of Botswana

- Botswana is: a landlocked country
- Location:
  - Eastern Hemisphere and Southern Hemisphere
  - Africa
    - Southern Africa
  - Time zone: Central Africa Time (UTC+02)
  - Extreme points of Botswana
    - High: Otse Hill 1,491 m (4,892 ft)
    - Low: Confluence of Limpopo River and Shashe River 513 m (1,683 ft)
  - Land boundaries: 4,013 km

South Africa 1,840 km
Namibia 1,360 km
Zimbabwe 813 km
Zambia <1 km

- Coastline: none

- Population of Botswana: 1,639,833 (2006) – 147th most populous country
- Area of Botswana: 600,370 square kilometres (231,800 sq mi) – 46th largest country
- Atlas of Botswana

=== Environment of Botswana ===
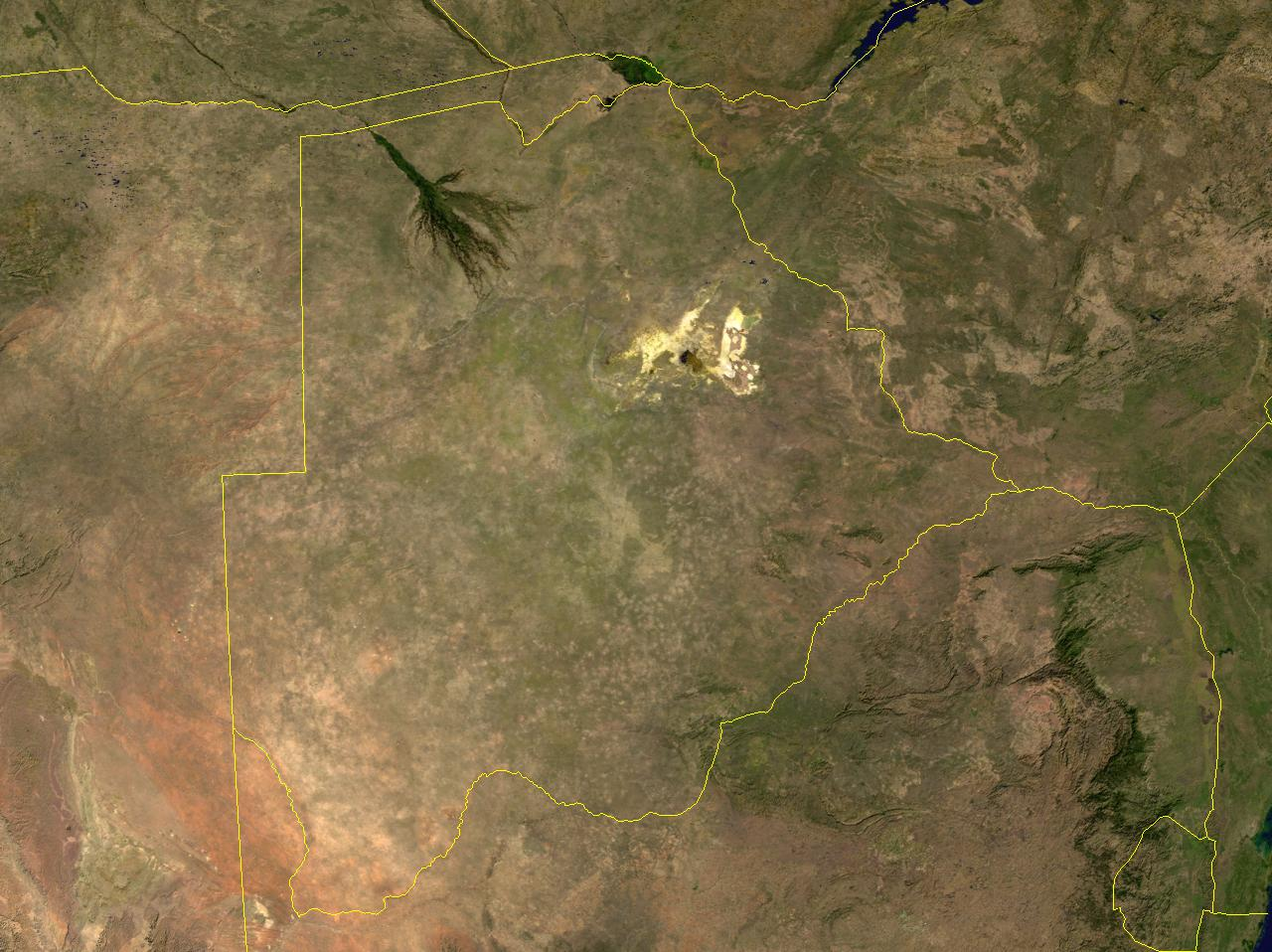
An enlargeable satellite image of Botswana

- Climate of Botswana
- Ecoregions in Botswana
- Geology of Botswana
- Protected areas of Botswana
  - National parks of Botswana
- Wildlife of Botswana
  - Fauna of Botswana
    - Birds of Botswana
    - Mammals of Botswana

==== Natural geographic features of Botswana ====
- Glaciers in Botswana: none
- Lakes of Botswana
  - Dams and reservoirs of Botswana
- Rivers of Botswana
- World Heritage Sites in Botswana: Tsodilo Hills and Okavango Delta

=== Regions of Botswana ===
Regions of Botswana

==== Ecoregions of Botswana ====
List of ecoregions in Botswana

==== Administrative divisions of Botswana ====
Administrative divisions of Botswana

- Districts of Botswana
  - Sub-districts of Botswana

===== Districts of Botswana =====
Districts of Botswana

===== Municipalities of Botswana =====
- Capital of Botswana: Gaborone
- Cities of Botswana

=== Demography of Botswana ===
Demographics of Botswana

== Government and politics of Botswana ==
- Form of government: parliamentary representative democratic republic
- Capital of Botswana: Gaborone
- Elections in Botswana
- Political parties in Botswana

=== Branches of government ===
Government of Botswana

==== Executive branch of the government of Botswana ====
- Head of state: President of Botswana
- Head of government: President of Botswana
- Cabinet of Botswana
  - President
  - Vice president
  - Minister of Presidential Affairs and Public Administration
  - Minister of Local Government
  - Minister of Trade and Industry
  - Minister of Finance and Development Planning
  - Minister of Youth, Sports and Culture
  - Minister of Minerals, Energy and Water Resources
  - Minister of Infrastructure, Science and Technology
  - Minister of Defence, Justice and Security
  - Minister of Agriculture
  - Minister of Works and Transport
  - Minister of Labour and Home Affairs
  - Minister of Health
  - Minister of Foreign Affairs and International Cooperation (MoFAIC)
  - Minister of Environment, Wildlife and Tourism
  - Minister of Education and Skills Development
  - Minister of Lands and Housing

==== Legislative branch of the government of Botswana ====
- Parliament of Botswana (bicameral)
  - Upper house: Ntlo ya Dikgosi
  - Lower house: National Assembly of Botswana
    - Parliamentary constituencies of Botswana

==== Judicial branch of the government of Botswana ====
Court system of Botswana

=== Foreign relations of Botswana ===
Foreign relations of Botswana

- Diplomatic missions in Botswana
- Diplomatic missions of Botswana

==== International organization membership ====
The Republic of Botswana is a member of:

- African, Caribbean, and Pacific Group of States (ACP)
- African Development Bank Group (AfDB)
- African Union (AU)
- Commonwealth of Nations
- Food and Agriculture Organization (FAO)
- Group of 77 (G77)
- International Atomic Energy Agency (IAEA)
- International Bank for Reconstruction and Development (IBRD)
- International Civil Aviation Organization (ICAO)
- International Criminal Court (ICCt)
- International Criminal Police Organization (Interpol)
- International Development Association (IDA)
- International Federation of Red Cross and Red Crescent Societies (IFRCS)
- International Finance Corporation (IFC)
- International Fund for Agricultural Development (IFAD)
- International Labour Organization (ILO)
- International Monetary Fund (IMF)
- International Olympic Committee (IOC)
- International Organization for Standardization (ISO)
- International Red Cross and Red Crescent Movement (ICRM)
- International Telecommunication Union (ITU)
- International Telecommunications Satellite Organization (ITSO)
- International Trade Union Confederation (ITUC)
- Inter-Parliamentary Union (IPU)
- Multilateral Investment Guarantee Agency (MIGA)
- Nonaligned Movement (NAM)
- Organisation for the Prohibition of Chemical Weapons (OPCW)
- Southern African Customs Union (SACU)
- Southern African Development Community (SADC)
- United Nations (UN)
- United Nations Conference on Trade and Development (UNCTAD)
- United Nations Educational, Scientific, and Cultural Organization (UNESCO)
- United Nations Industrial Development Organization (UNIDO)
- United Nations Mission in the Sudan (UNMIS)
- Universal Postal Union (UPU)
- World Customs Organization (WCO)
- World Federation of Trade Unions (WFTU)
- World Health Organization (WHO)
- World Intellectual Property Organization (WIPO)
- World Meteorological Organization (WMO)
- World Tourism Organization (UNWTO)
- World Trade Organization (WTO)

=== Law and order in Botswana ===
Law of Botswana

- Constitution of Botswana
- Human rights in Botswana
  - LGBT rights in Botswana
  - Freedom of religion in Botswana
- Law Enforcement in Botswana

=== Military of Botswana ===
Military of Botswana

- Command
  - Commander-in-chief:
- Forces
  - Army of Botswana
  - Navy of Botswana: None
  - Air Force of Botswana

=== Local government in Botswana ===
Local government in Botswana

== History of Botswana ==
History of Botswana

- History of Gaborone

== Culture of Botswana ==
Culture of Botswana

- Cuisine of Botswana
- Languages of Botswana
- National symbols of Botswana
  - Coat of arms of Botswana
  - Flag of Botswana
  - National anthem of Botswana
- People of Botswana
- Prostitution in Botswana
- Public holidays in Botswana
- Religion in Botswana
  - Christianity in Botswana
  - Hinduism in Botswana
  - Islam in Botswana
  - Sikhism in Botswana
- World Heritage Sites in Botswana:
  - Okavango Delta
  - Tsodilo

=== Art in Botswana ===
- Art in Botswana
- Music of Botswana

=== Sports in Botswana ===
Sports in Botswana

- Football in Botswana
- Botswana at the Olympics
- Athletics in Botswana

== Economy and infrastructure of Botswana ==
- Economic rank, by nominal GDP (2025): 129th (one hundred and twenty-ninth)
- Agriculture in Botswana
- Communications in Botswana
  - Internet in Botswana
- Companies of Botswana
- Currency of Botswana: Pula
  - ISO 4217: BWP
- Energy in Botswana
- Health care in Botswana
- Mining in Botswana
- Botswana Stock Exchange
- Tourism in Botswana
- Transport in Botswana
  - Airports in Botswana
  - Rail transport in Botswana
- Buildings in Botswana
  - iTowers of Masa Square CBD

== Education in Botswana ==
Education in Botswana

== Health in Botswana ==
Health in Botswana

== See also ==
- List of Botswana-related topics
- List of international rankings
- Member state of the Commonwealth of Nations
- Member state of the United Nations
- Outline of Africa
- Outline of geography
