= List of newspapers in Botswana =

This is an incomplete list of newspapers published in Botswana.

== Newspapers ==
- Azhizhi
- The Botswana Gazette
- The Business Weekly and Review
- Botswana Guardian
- Botswana Youth Magazine
- The Daily News (Botswana), a government-owned media outlet
- Farmers Guide
- The Midweek Sun
- Mmegi
- The Monitor
- The Patriot on Sunday
- The Sunday Standard
- The Voice
- Weekend Post

== See also ==
- Media of Botswana
- List of radio stations in Africa
- Telecommunications in Botswana
- Internet in Botswana
