= Botswana Television =

National broadcaster in Botswana

- Type: Broadcast
- Country: Botswana
- Motto: "Together we are the future." ("Mmogo re isago")
- Broadcast area: Southern Africa
- Area: Gaborone, Botswana
- Owner: Government of Botswana
- Launch date: 1965 (radio); 2000 (television)
- Digital channels: (4:3) & (16:9)
- Picture format: 1080p (HDTV)
- Sister Channels: BTV 1 BTV 2 BTV News; Now Channel
- Radio: 2 national radio stations and 3 privately owned
- Official website: www.btv.gov.bw

Botswana Television (also known as BTV and Botswana TV) is the national broadcaster in Botswana. Botswana's first national television service started in 2000 following a 1997 government decision. The station delivers thirteen hours of local and international programmes daily on weekdays and 13 hours of programming on weekends.

== Programming ==
Botswana Television usually offers local content during its run. Shows like Pula Power, Flava Dome and Mokaragana aim to entertain Botswana nationwide through popular music. The TV drama, Pelokgale encourages Batswana to stop Gender Based Violence. News is also broadcast daily.

As of 2020, 91% of BTV's programming was produced within Botswana, well ahead of the minimum imposed by the local regulator, which stipulates at least 60% of local programming.

== History ==
When Botswana achieved independence in 1966, television was virtually unheard of. In 1968, news editors visited the country on a rare basis to shoot footage for news agencies, at a time when there were no professional technical film facilities. In February 1984, President Ketumile Masire suggested the introduction of a television service in the country, saying that broadcast media was incomplete without television. In late November 1984, a "new television network for Botswana" was already being considered. In February 1986, it was revealed within government that setting up a television station was "too expensive to maintain".

A 1988 feasibility study report issued by the International Telecommunication Union suggested that Botswana should operate a small-scale commercial television station. The report had the consultation of Radio Botswana, several government ministries and the University of Botswana. The recommendations suggested that the television service should foster a national identity, as an educational tool and increase awareness of health and modern farming. However, the process was hampered by the growing violence and massive social concerns at the time of the apex of HIV/AIDS, as well as "portrayal of affluent lifestyle" and concerns that advertising would bring consumerist culture. If the government insisted, the ITU would change the concept of the then-planned service to a public service broadcaster as opposed to a commercial broadcaster. By 1989, the plan for a service was touted as being "extremely weak", and that 1.5% of the Botswanan population should have access to a television set, if such a service started. The ITU suggested that television viewing centres would be set up but the government refused over maintenance costs. Botswana's sixth National Development Plan suggested that a television service would start between 1985 and 1991.

The introduction of television in the late 1980s was seen with mixed feelings both at Radio Botswana and the government. Some thought it would prestige the country's urban elite. In 1991, the Institute of Development Management held a two-week course for the management and production of a television station. IDM director Ephraim Lepetu Setshwaelo suggested that a service would only be viable if it reached half of the national population, heavy amount of national content as opposed to foreign content, and as an apolitical tool. A new report in March 1992 contradicted the ITU's plan and showed a much cheaper option, a service whose rollout was phased, with a small news and current affairs unit.

A new report was issued by Studio Hamburg Media Consult in 1993. It suggested that the case to install such a service would be stronger than other proposals that had existed before. There were four options for a service, which was scheduled to start in 1997. These were:

- a government department;
- a parastatal corporation with total government control;
- a joint-venture between the government (with shares not exceeding 49%) and a private company;
- an entirely-private company.

With these plans in mind, the ownership of television sets in Botswana would increase from 28,000 in 1993 to between 180,000 and 260,000 by 2012. Similar to the ITU feasibility study, the new report suggested the creation of television viewing centres, starting with secondary schools. Advertising fees would cover the cost of the service over a fifteen-year period, and there was the possibility of starting satellite broadcasts by 2007 (the technology available would come sooner than expected). The government rejected Studio Hamburg's feasibility study on technical and financial grounds. The costs of the hypothetical service were still high. The idea of a parastatal television service turned out to be more attractive. A new alternative was sketched out by the Television Reference Group, suggesting a production house that would feed programming to small booster stations in Gaborone, Jwaneng, Morupule, Selebi-Phikwe, Francistown and Orapa. This new plan was rejected by the Department of Information and Broadcasting, citing inadequacies of public broadcasting requirements. The DIB also said that the new service wouldn't act as an embarrassment to viewers who relied on "superior" programming from the SABC channels and M-Net, both from South Africa.

In 1996, the Minister of Presidential Affairs and Public Administration P.H.K. Kedikilwe, suggested to parliament that a pilot television service was being studied, following the rejections of the former feasibility studies. Thanks to advancements in satellite technology, it would be possible for the new service to be received nationwide by the year 2000. The government took a formal decision on 26 March 1997 with the government owning the channel, without giving public debate over the choice. In the April–May period of that year, Kedikilwe suggested the channel to be set up during NDP 8, covering the period between 1997 and 2003, with an estimated launch date in 2000. A television service was to be set up during NDP 7, but feasibility studies were against the establishment.

The BTV project started in January 1998, with hopes of launching in April 1999, in time for the country's general elections. Thomas Nkhoma of BOPA set a different target in the same month, with the service launching within 18 to 24 months. Kevin Hunt started working for the project on 19 January. He had invited a team of television production experts to train in both the technical and production sides of the project. He was hired for a monthly salary of 26,000 pula and was the highest paid "civil servant". Within six months, he sourced Paul Farnsworth for the post of senior engineer and David Millard for the post of training the staff. By the time the project was nearing completion, it was already facing massive difficulties. Initially the service was going to start by the end of 1999, following the recommendation of Thomas Nhkoma. Construction of the facilities started in September 1998. In April 1999, 500 of its workers went on strike. By November 2000, months after BTV had started broadcasting, the DABS had extended the completion of the Mass Media Complex by the end of 2000.

BTV secured crucial equipment at ProAV Africa in 1999, with over 40 companies bidding for the equipment. The network was, according to Kevin Hunt, designing "the requirements of a 21st century broadcaster". The Botswana Gazette reported in August 1999 that the launch of BTV was delayed to 2000, from the original plan of launching in October 1999.

There were many names suggested for the television station. Hunt had given Batswana the chance to name the service. Among the names that were suggested were "Goora motho", "Sedibeng Television Station", "Katlego", "Lebone la Botswana", "Tswelelo", "Seipone sa Botswana", "Tshupetso Station", "Waledi ya meso", "Masa TV" and "Bona o reetse". Hunt eventually rejected the names from the contest and selected the name Botswana Television (BTV) instead, rather than Botswana Broadcasting Corporation (BBC) or Botswana Radio and Television (BRT). Hunt gave a report in May 1999 stipulating that BTV would be operated along the lines of the BBC, with some sort of charter akin to the BBC Charter, while furthering Botswana's reputation at home and abroad and have the ability to be a "worthwhile, cost-effective and pro-active broadcaster". To achieve minimal government costs, advertising was to be allowed and had its facilities rented to the private sector. After difficulties in the building plan, with the station yet to begin broadcasting, Hunt resigned from the project in March 2000.

With BTV still under construction, Makgekgenene pressured to bring the BBC to save the project from failure. Makgekgenene brought two consultants from BBC Resources (David Manning and Liz Duckworth) to provide basic support in all fields needed for the station to operate properly. By May 2000, BTV had no set strategy, but was clear to go on the air in July. The strategy was divided between the possibility of being a news channel, an entertainment channel or a channel providing heavy amounts of local content not seen on other channels. Had it went past the strategy of being an entertainment channel, it would rely on expensive foreign programming rights with the goal of competing against SABC and M-Net. By the middle of July, Simon Higman announced that BTV would go on the air on or before 31 July. About 60% of the programming was going to be local. The channel was going to broadcast between 7pm and 10pm on weekdays and between 2pm and 10pm on weekends. The channel was given the go ahead to carry commercial advertising and sponsorships for some of its programmes; the news was exempt from such to assure its independent status.

It was launched on 31 July 2000, BTV has established itself in Botswana's viewing habits. At the time of its launch, it was Africa's most technologically advanced television station, relying entirely on digital technology. Precisely on its launch day, Ted Mekgegenene, resigned from his post as Botswana's Director of Information and Broadcasting. The first full day of operations - 1 August 2000 - started symbolically with the BTV news in Setswana, followed by an interview with Tebelelo Seretse and a charity event. BTV aimed to have 70% of its output produced in Botswana. Production was low outside of the wildlife sector. The channel used the PAS-7 satellite in the clear to broadcast its signal, the same satellite was also used by DStv's subscription bouquet. Early in its existence, it secured rights to the 2000-2001 Premier League season. Due to its FTA coverage across Southern Africa, it attracted attention to the new and largely unheard-of channel. This prompted M-Net to act quickly by signing a five-year contract for the same league.

The children's programme "Mantlwaneng" was a leading part of a fledgling BTV when it launched. Its child stars, Marang Molosiwa, Rea Kopi, Phenyo Mogampane and StaXx have gone onto careers based on this early experience. As of 2002, BTV had thirteen in-house productions, up from the beginning when it was limited mainly to the news.

Although BTV produced a heavy amount of local content, within a few years from its launch, its airtime had reduced. In 2004, marketing director Mpho Kgosidintsi said that it was cheaper to buy foreign programming rather than producing local programming. In 2005 alone, the government had paid P7.5 million in acquiring such content and P1.5 million in producing local content. For a package of 260 episodes of The Bold and the Beautiful, BTV paid P1.500 per episode, as opposed to a documentary by a local production house that cost P8.000. Programming that lasted more than one or two seasons was more expensive by the minute. With film and television production standards still considered "infantile", BTV rejected the screening of the 13-episode drama series Flat 101, which was eventually picked up by GBC TV.

BTV slowly removed some foreign programmes in order to try to improve its image as a broadcaster delivering Botswanan content. In early 2008, the channel ceased simulcasting BBC World overnight. The lack of quality local content and the monopoly imposed by the state forced Batswana to lure away from the channel and watch South African terrestrial networks using Philibao satellite receivers. The removal of some popular international programmes such as Dr. Phil, The Oprah Winfrey Show, Passions and WWE Raw, as well as football, infuriated the viewers, while others saw that such acts hampered BTV's development.

It was announced in 2009 that BTV would air the sequel of the local drama Re Bina Mmogo, whose first season aired in 2005. Shooting was held in September and October 2009, with the aim of premiering in early 2010.

Botswana Television started its new offer of channels on October 2, 2022. The change coincided with the switch-off of analogue terrestrial signals in the country. The new channels are BTV 1 (entertainment), BTV 2 (education) and BTV News. On 29 September 2025, BTV and Radio Botswana started producing news bulletins in iKalanga, Naro, Sheiyei and Shekgalagari.

== Approach ==
The station aims to provide at least 60% local content to meet the diverse needs of Botswana. It seeks to align its strategy with the national vision, Vision 2016. The majority of Batswana are young people and Botswana has diverse cultural and language groups.

BTV is the first station in Africa and the second in the world after ITN (UK-based Independent Television News) to fully use digital technology. Its signal is carried on the Intelsat 20 satellite with a significant footprint, which covers the whole country, and most of the Southern African Development Community (SADC) region. The station is fully Serial Digital Video, 4:3 and 16:9 switchable, but with the flexibility of analogue with dual language stereo capabilities.

The station uses the Quantel Inspiration System for processing and transmission with the news processing software ENPS (Electronic News Production System) in the newsroom. Its server-based technology gives the news the speed and flexibility sought by journalists and news editors.

To cover the wide area of the country, two satellite News Gathering (SNG) teams are based in the North and North-West - Francistown and Maun respectively. Their area of responsibility stretches from Palapye/Serowe to the border with Zimbabwe and Zambia. The Maun team also covers Ghanzi the extreme West.

== ISDB-T / SBTVD ==
Features:

- Supports ISDB-T broadcast (13 segments).
- MPEG-2/ MPEG-4 AVC/ H.264 HD/ SD video.
- DiVX Compatible with 480i/ 480p/ 720p/ 1080i/ 1080p video formats. Auto and Manually scan all available TV and radio channels.
- Aspect ratio 16:9 and 4:3.
- 1000 channels memory.
- Parental control.
- Teletext/ Bit map subtitle.
- Compliant with ETS1.
- Supported 7 days EPG function.
- VBI Teletext support 6 MHz software setting Auto/ Manual program search.
- Multi language supported.

== Controversies ==
Chris Bishop, head of BTV's news division, resigned from the broadcaster in 2001 due to concerns that the government was interfering news bulletins.

In 2006, BTV was accused of returning an undisclosed large sum of money to producers, but independent production companies did not receive the money they gained, owing to BTV's standards. BTV was also a target of controversies for favouring foreign programmes over local programmes.

== See also ==
- Botswana
- Internet in Botswana
- Botswana Internet Exchange
- Telecommunications in Botswana
- Botswana Telecommunications Authority
