= Census in Botswana =

Nationwide decennial census

The Botswana Population and Housing Census is a decennial census which is the once-a-decade population and housing count of all people in Botswana. This census is carried out by the Statistics Botswana (formerly Central Statistics Office).

The most recent census took place in 2022; the next census is scheduled for 2031. Through the census, Botswana systematically obtains/records information on demographic, social and economic characteristics, pertaining to all persons in the geographic boundaries of the country at a specified time. The Population and Housing Census aims to count all persons, vis. citizens, non-citizens, visitors, babies, elderly, etc. living in Botswana and determine the socio-economic and demographic characteristics of the population. Such characteristics include among others, the total number, geographic distribution by sex, age, migration patterns, education, housing characteristics, household sizes, etc. Therefore, the census covers all inhabitants in Botswana. The results of the census provide the Government and other stakeholders with relevant, reliable and timely baseline data and statistical information for development planning, policy formulation and service delivery as well as for monitoring and evaluation of development programs and plans.

Census is a project that is provided for in the Census Act of 1904 and Statistics Act of 2009. The population and housing census is a national exercise and it is implemented by the District Commissioners in their respective districts. Statistics Botswana, being the National Statistical Office is entrusted with the responsibility to coordinate the project. The Statistician General (SG) is the Principal Investigator responsible to Government for the conduct of the census while the District Commissioners (DCs) are the District Census Coordinators in the respective districts.

== Geographic divisions ==
Botswana is made up of 10 administrative districts plus the two cities of Francistown and Gaborone. For census purposes, there are 28 census districts, which consist of; two

Districts of Botswana

(2) cities, five (5) towns, 17 sub districts and four (4) districts with no sub-district.

== Confidentiality ==
The Census Act and Statistics Act strictly stipulates the protection and confidentiality of individual's data obtained during the census. The law goes further to spell out penalties for those (census officials and members of the public) who violate it.

== History ==
Botswana Population and Housing Census
Year	Pop.	±% p.a.
1904	120,776	—
1911	124,350	+0.42%
1921	152,983	+2.09%
1936	265,756	+3.75%
1946	296,310	+1.09%
1956	309,175	+0.43%
1964	549,510	+7.45%
1971	596,994	+1.19%
1981	941,027	+4.66%
1991	1,326,796	+3.50%
2001	1,680,863	+2.39%
2011	2,024,787	+1.88%
2022	2,359,609	+1.40%

=== Bechuanaland Protectorate ===
The seven censuses of Botswana before its independence happened irregularly. Due to the Anglo-Boer War, the first census of Bechuanaland Protectorate, originally set to occur in 1901, took place on 17 April 1904. The 1931 census was postponed to 1936 because of the Great Depression. The early censuses were unreliable and took several years to tabulate; the results were outdated by the time they were calculated.

=== Post-independence ===
There have been six censuses after the independence of Botswana, each occurring every ten years in the year ending in 1 (i.e. 1971, 1981, 1991, 2001, 2011, and 2022). The 1971 census was the first census in Botswana to use de facto enumeration; this method counts people based on how many people spent census night at a specific location. Previously, the citizens were counted based on their usual place of residence. The 2001 census was the first census in Botswana to comply with the SADC 2000 Census Project, the guidelines of which unify the demographic statistics in southern Africa. The most recent census was the 2022 Botswana Population and Housing Census, which occurred in April 2022.

== See also ==
- 2011 Botswana population and housing census
- Demographics of Botswana
- Statistics Botswana
