= Directorate of Intelligence and Security =

National intelligence agency of Botswana

- Abbreviation: DIS
- Established: 2007
- Purpose: Cyberwarfare; Counterintelligence; Internal security Intelligence agency Security agency
- Region served: Botswana
- Parent organization: Government of Botswana
- Website: dis.org.bw

The Directorate of Intelligence and Security (DIS) is the internal intelligence agency of Botswana founded under the Intelligence and Security Service Act which commenced in 2008. The DIS was formed to oversee matters of the counterintelligence and internal security of Botswana. The DIS has investigative jurisdiction to arrest or detain and interrogate over a wide range of criminal offenses.

== Functions ==
The DIS' functions include:

- Investigate, gather, co-ordinate, analyze, correlate, interpret, store and distribute information, regardless of whether it is about things inside or outside of Botswana, for the purposes of detecting and recognizing threats to national security, advising the President and the Botswanan Government about any threat to national security, and taking political, economic, and or militaristic steps in order to protect the security interests of Botswana
- Gather ministerial intelligence at the request of any Government ministry, department or agency and, without delay, to assess and transmit the requested information to that ministry, department or agency
- Regulate, in co-operation with any Government ministry, department or agency tasked with overseeing any aspect of the maintenance of national security, the flow of intelligence and security, and the co-ordination between the Directorate and that agency, ministry, or agency of functions relating to intelligence
- Advise Government, public bodies and statutory bodies on the protection of vital installations and classified documents
- Perform security vetting investigations for the security clearance of individuals who have access to any sensitive or classified information
- Make recommendations to the President regarding policies about intelligence and security, intelligence and security priorities, and security measures in Government ministries, departments, and agencies
- Provide personal protection to the former President, former President's immediate family, the President, the President's immediate family, the Vice-President, the Vice-President's immediate family, visiting dignitaries and such other persons as the President may determine

== Organization ==
The Director General for the Agency is Brigadier Peter Magosi who was previously on the Special Forces for the Botswana Defence Force before being appointed to the agency in 2018. Edward Robert is the Public relations officer of the DIS.

=== Organizational Structure ===
The DIS is made up of various divisions and units including:

- Director General
  - Deputy Director General
    - Internal Intelligence Division
    - External Intelligence Division

They also have a tactical unit called the Special Task Team (abbreviation: STT).

== See also ==
- Botswana Communications Regulatory Authority
- Civil Aviation Authority of Botswana
- Statistics Botswana
