= CAAB =

CAAB may refer to:

- Civil Aviation Authority of Bangladesh
- Civil Aviation Authority of Botswana
- Codes for Australian Aquatic Biota
