= Botswana National Broadcasting Board =

Agency overview
- Formed: 2000
- Jurisdiction: Government of Botswana
- Headquarters: Gaborone
- Minister responsible: Hon. Mrs. P. Venson-Moitoi
- Agency executive: Dr. M. Mpotokwane, Chairman
- Parent agency: Botswana Telecommunications Authority
- Website: NBB Website

The Botswana National Broadcasting Board (NBB) was set up by the Broadcasting Act, 1998 (No. 6 of 1999). The Board consists of eleven members who were appointed in August 2000. Section 10 of the Act, includes Board functions such as the issuing of broadcasting licences and the control and supervision of broadcasting activities, including the relaying of radio and television programmes from places in and out of Botswana to places in and outside Botswana.

== Mandate ==
=== Roles (Summary) ===
- Act as general advisor to National Broadcasting Board (NBB)
- Act as a support link between Botswana Telecommunications Authority (BTA) and NBB
- Recommend code of conduct
- Monitor global broadcast developments
- Broadcast representation nationally, regionally and internationally

=== Licensing ===
The NBB issues licences on the following types of broadcasting services in Botswana.

- Public broadcasting
- Private broadcasting and
- Community broadcasting

== Highlights and Controversies ==
- 2007: National Broadcasting Board v Multichoice Botswana. The Board issued a broadcasting licence to Multichoice in 2005, and subsequently, in 2007, made an order setting aside the decision to issue the licence. The Court of Appeal decided that

the NBB had acted ultra vires its powers in licensing Multichoice Botswana as a broadcaster.

- 2008 - Digital Migration Strategy: The NBB highlighted the need for the development of the digital migration strategy to the Minister at a meeting in December 2007. The BTA is expected to play a significant role in this task

== Botswana's ISDB-T ==
Features:

- Supports ISDB-T broadcast (1 segment).
- MPEG-2/ MPEG-4 AVC/ H.264 HD/ SD video.
- DiVX Compatible with 480i/ 480p/ 720p/ 1080i/ 1080p video formats. Auto and Manually scan all available TV and radio channels.
- Aspect ratio 16:9 and 4:3.
- 1000 channels memory.
- Parental control.
- Teletext/ Bit Map Subtitle.
- Compliant with ETS1.
- Supported 7 days EPG fiction.
- VBI Teletext support 6 MHz software setting auto/ manual program search.
- Multi language supported.

== See also ==
- Botswana
- Internet in Botswana
- Botswana Internet Exchange
- Botswana Telecommunications Authority
