= Telecommunications in Botswana =

Telecommunications in Botswana include newspapers, radio, television, fixed and mobile telephones, and the Internet.

In addition to the government-owned newspaper and national radio network, there is an active, independent press (six weekly newspapers). Foreign publications are sold without restriction in Botswana. Two privately owned radio stations began operations in 1999. Botswana's first national television station, the government-owned Botswana Television (BTV), was launched in July 2000. It began broadcasting with three hours of programming on weekdays and five on weekends, offering news in Setswana and English, entertainment, and sports, with plans to produce 60% of its programming locally. The cellular phone providers Orange and MTN cover most of the country.

== Radio stations ==
- 2 state-owned national radio stations; 3 privately owned radio stations broadcast locally (2007);
- AM 8, FM 13, shortwave 4 (2001).

== Television stations ==
One state-owned and one privately owned; privately owned satellite TV subscription service is available (2007).

Television sets in use:

- 101,713 (2001);
- 98,568 (2003).
- 173,327 (2006)
- 297,233 (2008)
- 297,971 (2011)
- 365,650 (2014).

== Telephones ==
Main lines in use:

- 160,500 lines, 134th in the world (2012);
- 136,900 (2006).

Mobile cellular in use:

- 3.1 million lines, 129th in the world (2012);

Telephone system

- general assessment: Botswana is participating in regional development efforts; expanding fully digital system with fiber-optic cables linking the major population centers in the east as well as a system of open-wire lines, microwave radio relays links, and radiotelephone communication stations (2011);
- domestic: fixed-line teledensity has declined in recent years and now stands at roughly 7 telephones per 100 persons; mobile-cellular teledensity now pushing 140 telephones per 100 persons (2011);
- international: country code - 267; international calls are made via satellite, using international direct dialing; 2 international exchanges; digital microwave radio relay links to Namibia, Zambia, Zimbabwe, and South Africa; satellite earth station - 1 Intelsat (Indian Ocean) (2011).

== ISDB-T ==
Features:

- Supports ISDB-T broadcast (13 segments).
- MPEG-2/ MPEG-4 AVC/ H.264 HD/ SD video.
- DiVX Compatible with 480i / 480p / 720p / 1080i/ 1080p video formats. Auto and manually scan all available TV and radio channels.
- Aspect ratio 16:9 and 4:3.
- 1000 channels memory.
- Parental control.
- Teletext / Bit map subtitle.
- Compliant with ETSI.
- Supported 7 days EPG function.
- VBI Teletext support 6 MHz software setting Auto / Manual program search.
- Multi language supported.

== Internet ==
Internet top-level domain: .bw

Internet users:

- 241,272 users, 148th in the world; 11.5% of the population, 166th in the world (2012);
- 120,000 users, 154th in the world (2009);
- 80,000 users (2007).

Internet broadband:

- 16,407 fixed broadband subscriptions, 134th in the world; 0.8% of the population, 143rd in the world;
- 348,124 wireless broadband subscriptions, 102nd in the world; 16.6% of the population, 76th in the world.

Internet hosts:

- 1,806 hosts (2012);
- 6,374 hosts (2008).

Internet IPv4 addresses: 100,096 addresses allocated, less than 0.05% of the world total, 47.7 addresses per 1000 people (2012).

Internet Service Providers:

- 11 ISPs (2001);
- 2 ISPs (1999).

ADSL has been introduced in the following areas: Gaborone, Tlkokweng, Mogoditsane, Phakalane, Francistown, Lobatse, Palapye, Maun, Kasane, Selibe-Phikwe, Letlhakane, Jwaneng, and Orapa.

== See also ==
- Botswana
- Botswana Television
- Media of Botswana
- Internet in Botswana
- Botswana Internet Exchange
- Telephone numbers in Botswana
- Botswana Communications Regulatory Authority
