= 2011 Botswana population and housing census =

- 22 August 2011– 31 August 2011

General information
- Country: Botswana

Results
- Total population: 2,024,787 (▲20.5%)

The 2011 Botswana population and housing census was the latest national census of Botswana. The enumeration was managed by the Statistics Botswana (formerly Central Statistics Office) and took place over ten days starting on 22 August 2011. The census counted a total population of 2,024,787, a 20.5% increase from the 2001 census.

== Cost ==
The total budget for the 2011 census was 243,575,993 pula (US$35.3 million as of August 2011) with the Botswana government funding all the costs. Over P100,000,000 was planned to pay for personnel.

== Controversy ==
Bushmen living in the Central Kalahari Game Reserve boycotted the census in response to an earlier situation where the Bushmen were not provided polling stations in the 2009 election. Jumanda Gakelebone spoke on behalf of the Bushmen, saying that "the government does not recognise us [the Bushmen] as a people. So why count us? They should count their own people and leave us alone."

== See also ==
- Census in Botswana
