= Statistics Botswana =

Botswanan government statistic bureau

Agency overview
- Formed: 1966
- Preceding agency: Central Statistics Office
- Jurisdiction: Government of Botswana
- Headquarters: FOUR THIRTY SQUARE Plot 54350 PG Matante Road CBD Gaborone, Botswana
- Agency executives: Dr Burton Mguni, Statistician General; Dr Lucky Mokgatlhe, Deputy Statistician General- Statistical Technical Operations; Ms Banabo Tshupeng, Chief Internal Auditor for Statistics Botswana; Phetogo Zambezi, Director of Standards Methods and Information Systems (DSMIS); Ms Boitumelo Matlhaga, Director of Economic Statistics; Mr Tapologo Benjamin Baakile, Director of Social and Demographic Statistics; Director Stakeholder Relations, Ketso K. Makhumalo
- Parent department: Office of the President
- Website: www.statsbots.org.bw

Statistics Botswana (StatsBots) is the national statistical bureau of Botswana. The organization was previously under the Ministry of Finance and Development Planning as a department and was called Central Statistics Office. The organisation was initially set up in 1967 through an Act of Parliament – the Statistics Act (Cap 17) and thereafter transformed into a parastatal through the revised Statistics Act of 2009. This act gives the Statistics Botswana the mandate and authority to collect, process, compile, analyse, publish, disseminate and archive official national statistics. It is also responsible for "coordinating, monitoring and supervising the National Statistical System" in Botswana. The office has its main offices in Gaborone and two satellite offices in Maun and Francistown. The different areas in statistics that should be collected are covered under this Act and are clearly specified. The other statistics that are not specified can be collected as long as they are required by the Government, stakeholders and the users.

== Legal mandate ==
Statistics Botswana conducts the Population and Housing Census (PHC) within the jurisdiction of two key legal instruments, namely:

- Census Act (Cap 17:02) of 1904
- Statistics Act (Cap 17:01) of 2009

The legal instruments stipulates that the census population of Botswana should be carried out every 10 years and any other censuses and surveys as it is determined or necessary. The Statistics Act 2009 authorizes the Statistician General to have access to records (administrative data, financial, geographic information etc.) from other statistics producing agencies.

The Statistics Act 2009 provides for confidentiality and disclosure of information. All staff of Statistics Botswana, including any contractors of Statistics Botswana are sworn to secrecy to not disclose any information that they came across by virtue of their employment (Section 20) of the Act and penalties are also provided for in the Act. In addition, .

== Data collection ==
Data collection is the process of gathering data for purposes of measuring information on variables of interest in an established systematic fashion that enables one to answer stated research question, test hypothesis and evaluate outcomes. Data is collected through various methods. The primary methods used by Statistics Botswana include questionnaires, face to face interviews, online interviews and desktop data collection.

=== Uses of data ===
Survey and census data update the demographic, social and economic data to support national development activities. The data also is used for informed decision making in various government, private and individual activities such as:

- Provision of data for constituency delimitation processes;
- Increase availability and accessibility of accurate, timely and reliable baseline data on demographic and socio-economic characteristics of the population;
- Provision of various demographic baseline indicators, such as current data for the determination of fertility, mortality and migration levels, patterns and trends, as well as population growth at national and sub-national levels;
- Formulation of development policies and programs as well as tracking and monitoring socio-economic development, among others
- Interpretation and dissemination of population census data in a manner that will ensure effective application as well as an understanding of the population
- factors in national development evidence-based decision making, formulation of policies, programmes and projects;
- Strengthening national capacities in data collection, processing, analysis, dissemination and utilization, including Geographic Information System (GIS), as well as, census strategic planning and management.

==== Censuses and surveys conducted ====
The following censuses and surveys have been conducted by Statistics Botswana.

SOCIAL SURVEYS and CENSUSES

2014 Botswana Literacy Survey (BLS)	2013 Botswana AIDS Impact Survey IV (BAIS)	2022 Botswana Population and Housing Census	2015/16 Botswana Multi-Topic Household Survey	2017 Botswana Demographic Survey	2021 Quarterly Multi-Topic Survey (QMTS)
National Literacy Survey Report 2014	Botswana AIDS Impact Survey IV 2013 Statistical Report	2022 Population and Housing Census Preliminary Results	Botswana Multi-Topic Household Survey 2015/16 Report :978-99968-2-040-3	Botswana Demographic Survey Report 2017	Quarterly Multi-Topic Survey Report Quarter 4, 2021

ECONOMIC SURVEYS

Economic surveys are conducted monthly, quarterly, and yearly. They cover selected sectors of the country’s economy and supplement the economic census with more-frequent information about the dynamic economy. These surveys produce publications that are shared in public domains for all to be informed.

2014 Botswana Household Access & Individual Use	2015 Agricultural Census Survey	2015 Census of Enterprises and Establishments
Botswana Household Access & individual use	Botswana Agricultural Census Report 2015	Census of Enterprises and Establishments 2016 Report: Phase 1

===== Ongoing surveys =====
- Quarterly Multi-Topic Survey (QMTS)
- Population and Housing Survey

== Other statistics ==
Statistics Botswana compiles and analyses economic statistics from administrative data and business surveys sources. The release of the key indicators varies in periodicity from monthly, quarterly or annually.

=== Gross domestic product ===
GDP Per Capita (Million Pula)	Nominal GDP per capita	Real GDP per capita	Growth
2014	67 867.9	40 743.3	2.2
2015	62,921.08	70,272.61	-7.3%
2016	74,072.27	74,072.27	5.4%
2017	73,856.92	75,865.40	2.4%
2018	75,381.33	77,689.12	2.4%
2019	76,815.33	78,815.76	1.5%
2020	72,662.90	70,567.11	-10.5%

=== Consumer price statistics ===
Annual Inflation Rate 2011 to 2021

Year	Average Annual Inflation Rate %
2011	8.5
2012	7.5
2013	5.9
2014	4.4
2015	3.1
2016	2.8
2017	3.3
2018	3.2
2019	2.8
2020	1.9
2021	6.7
2022	12.1

=== Publications ===
The statistical outputs released include microdata sets, survey reports, stats briefs and many others. The publications are available in the official digital channels of the organisation which are;

https://www.statsbots.org.bw

https://botswana.opendataforafrica.org/

https://microdata.statsbots.org.bw

Statistics Botswana produced a special publication on "Selected Statistical Indicators: 1966–2016" as part and contribution to Botswana's 50th anniversary of independence celebrations.

== See also ==
- Botswana Communications Regulatory Authority
- Civil Aviation Authority of Botswana
- Directorate of Intelligence and Security
