= International rankings of Botswana =

The following are international rankings of Botswana.

== Economy ==
- United Nations Development Programme: 2013 Human Development Index ranked 119 out of 187
- World Economic Forum: Global Competitiveness Report ranked 66 out of 133
- Countries of the World: 2024 Real GDP ranked 127 out of 229

== Military ==
- Vision of Humanity, 2013 Global Peace Index ranked 32 out of 162
- Countries of the World 2024 Military Expenditures, % of GDP ranked 22 out of 46

== Politics ==
- Transparency International: 2013 Corruption Perceptions Index ranked 30 out of 177
- Reporters Without Borders 2013 Press Freedom Index ranked 40 out of 179

== Technology ==
- World Intellectual Property Organization: Global Innovation Index 2026, ranked 82 out of 139 countries

== See also ==
- Cuisine of Botswana
- Communications in Botswana
- Music of Botswana
- Transport in Botswana
- List of Botswana-related topics
