= Otse Hill =

Mountain in Botswana

- Location within Botswana

Highest point
- Elevation: 1,491 m (4,892 ft)1:50,000 scale Botswana government topographic map, trig station
- Listing: Country high point
- Coordinates: 25°00′30″S 25°42′57″E

Geography
- Location: Otse, South-East District, Botswana

Otse Hill is a hill often cited as the highest hill in Botswana, with the reported highest altitude of 1,491 metres (4,891 feet). It is located in the village of Otse, South-East District. Its highest cell on SRTM data is 1,486 meters - 4875 feet. The 1999 Department of Surveys and Mapping (Gaborone) 1:50,000 scale topographic map shows a "trigonometrical station" on the Otse Peak summit with an elevation of 1,491 meters - 4892 feet.

The Monalanong Hill (at a SRTM-derived altitude of 1,494 metres - 4,902 feet) or the Tsodilo Hills (at an altitude of about 1400 metres - 4,593 feet) are also often given as the highest hill in Botswana.

== See also ==
- Geography of Botswana
