= Telephone numbers in Botswana =

- Country: Botswana
- Continent: Africa
- Regulator: Botswana Communications Regulatory Authority
- Membership: closed
- NSN length: 7
- Country code: +267
- International access: 00

Fixed line numbers in Botswana are seven digits long in a closed telephone numbering plan, with the geographical area being indicated by the first two or three digits, meaning that there are no area codes. The country was allocated its own country code by the International Telecommunication Union, +267, in the late 1960s.

== Calling formats ==
- xx xxxxx or xxx xxxxx – calling within Botswana
- +267 xx xxxxx or +267 xxx xxxxx – calling from outside Botswana

The NSN length is seven digits for fixed lines, and eight digits for VoIP and mobile ranges.

Until the 1990s, calls to Botswana could be made from South Africa using the regional code 0192.

== General allocations ==
LIST OF ALLOCATIONS
Prefix	Usage
1XX	Short codes
20	Non-geographic numbering
21 - 29	Geographic numbering (Francistown region)
30	Non-geographic numbering
31 - 39	Geographic numbering (Gaborone)
40	Non-geographic numbering
41 - 49	Geographic numbering (Palapye region)
50	Non-geographic numbering
51 - 59	Geographic numbering (south-east region)
60	Non-geographic numbering
61 - 69	Geographic numbering (north and west regions)
70 - 79	Personal and mobile numbering
80 - 89	Non-geographic numbering (freephone, etc.)
90	Premium rate services (non-geographic)
91 - 98	Reserved
99X	Emergency services

== Fixed allocations in Botswana ==
LIST OF FIXED ALLOCATIONS
Number range	Area
538 XXXX	Ramotswa Area
539 XXXX	Ramotswa Area
471 XXXX	Mahalapye Area
472 XXXX	Mahalapye Area
476 XXXX	Mahalapye Area
477 XXXX	Mahalapye Area
659 XXXX	Gantsi Area
490 XXXX	Palapye Area
491 XXXX	Palapye Area
492 XXXX	Palapye Area
493 XXXX	Palapye Area
494 XXXX	Palapye Area
495 XXXX	Palapye Area
260 XXXX	Selebi-Phikwe Area
261 XXXX	Selebi-Phikwe Area
262 XXXX	Selebi-Phikwe Area
264 XXXX	Selebi-Phikwe Area
240 XXXX	Francistown Area
241 XXXX	Francistown Area
242 XXXX	Francistown Area
243 XXXX	Francistown Area
244 XXXX	Francistown Area
248 XXXX	Francistown Area
290 XXXX	Letlhakane/Orapa Area
295 XXXX	Letlhakane/Orapa Area
297 XXXX	Letlhakane/Orapa Area
298 XXXX	Letlhakane/Orapa Area
651 XXXX	Kgalagadi Area
654 XXXX	Kgalagadi Area
460 XXXX	Serowe Area
463 XXXX	Serowe Area
590 XXXX	Molepolole Area
591 XXXX	Molepolole Area
592 XXXX	Molepolole Area
593 XXXX	Molepolole Area
594 XXXX	Molepolole Area
599 XXXX	Molepolole Area
680 XXXX	Maun Area
686 XXXX	Maun Area
687 XXXX	Maun Area
310 XXXX	Outer Gaborone Area
540 XXXX	Barolong/Ngwaketse Area
544 XXXX	Barolong/Ngwaketse Area
548 XXXX	Barolong/Ngwaketse Area
549 XXXX	Barolong/Ngwaketse Area
571 XXXX	Mochudi Area
572 XXXX	Mochudi Area
573 XXXX	Mochudi Area
574 XXXX	Mochudi Area
577 XXXX	Mochudi Area
392 XXXX	Gaborone Area
394 XXXX	Gaborone Area
395 XXXX	Gaborone Area
390 XXXX	Gaborone Area
391 XXXX	Gaborone Area
397 XXXX	Gaborone Area
355 XXXX	Gaborone Area
311 XXXX	Gaborone Area
312 XXXX	Gaborone Area
313 XXXX	Gaborone Area
315 8250	Gaborone Area
316 XXXX	Gaborone Area
317 XXXX	Gaborone Area
318 XXXX	Gaborone Area
319 XXXX	Gaborone Area
530 XXXX	Lobatse Area
533 XXXX	Lobatse Area
588 XXXX	Jwaneng Area
360 XXXX	Gaborone Area
361 XXXX	Gaborone Area
362 XXXX	Gaborone Area
363 XXXX	Gaborone Area
364 XXXX	Gaborone Area
365 XXXX	Gaborone Area
366 XXXX	Gaborone Area
367 XXXX	Gaborone Area
368 XXXX	Gaborone Area
369 XXXX	Gaborone Area
370 XXXX	Gaborone Area
371 XXXX	Gaborone Area
393 XXXX	Gaborone Area
621 XXXX	Kasane Area
622 XXXX	Kasane Area
623 XXXX	Kasane Area
625 XXXX	Kasane Area

== Mobile numbers ==
Mobile numbers are eight digits long, with the first two digits indicating the network operator.

LIST OF MOBILE ALLOCATIONS
Number range	Operator
71 000 000 – 71 999 999	Mascom Wireless
74 000 000 – 74 299 999	Mascom Wireless
74 500 000 – 74 799 999	Mascom Wireless
75 400 000 – 75 699 999	Mascom Wireless
75 900 000 – 75 999 999	Mascom Wireless
76 000 000 – 76 299 999	Mascom Wireless
76 600 000 – 76 799 999	Mascom Wireless
72 000 000 – 72 999 999	Orange Botswana
74 300 000 – 74 499 999	Orange Botswana
75 000 000 – 75 399 999	Orange Botswana
76 300 000 – 76 599 999	Orange Botswana
73 000 000 – 73 999 999	Botswana Telecommunications Corporation (BTC)
