= Geography of Botswana =

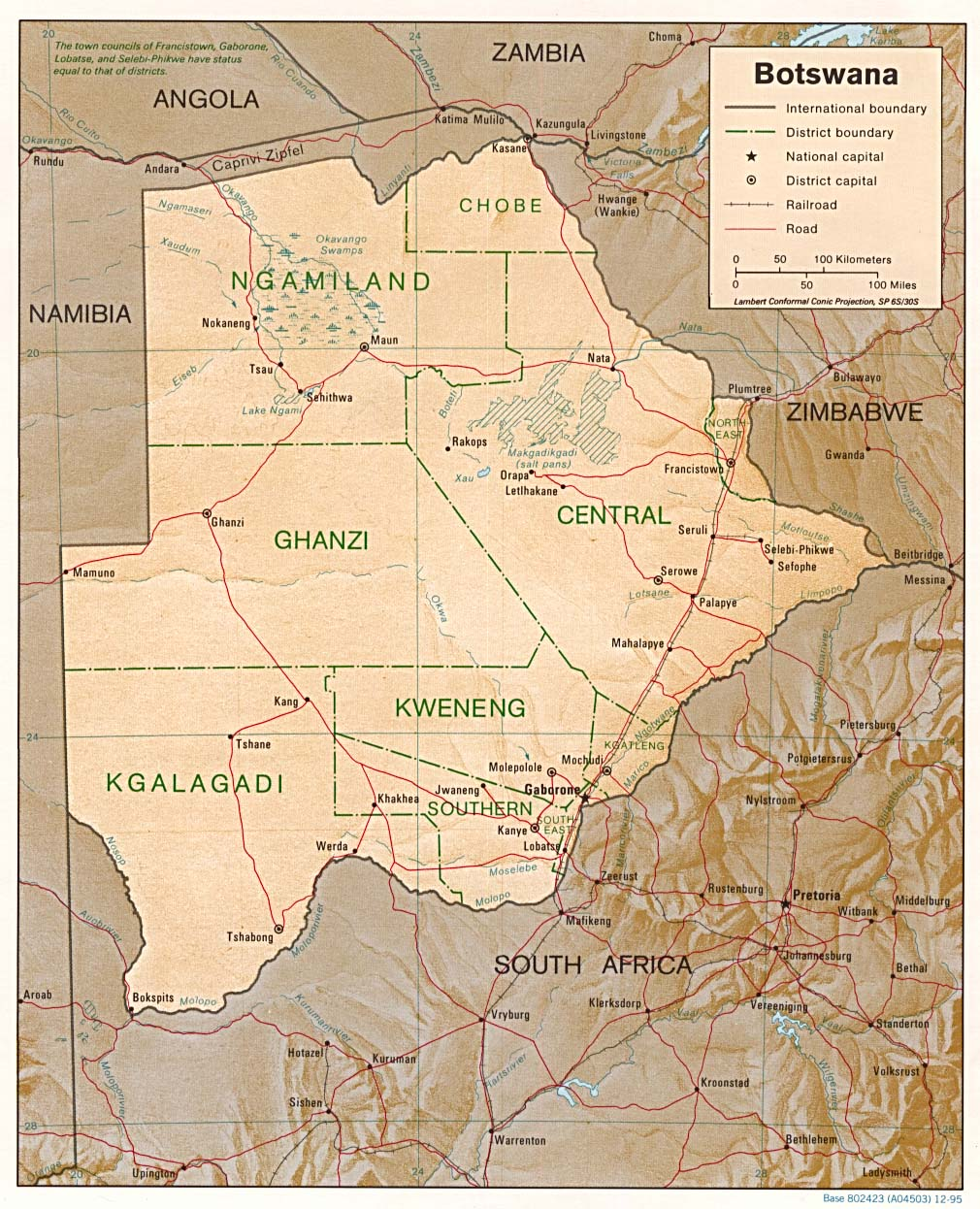
- Continent: Africa
- Region: Southern Africa
- Coordinates: 22°00′S 24°00′E
- Area: Ranked 48th
  - Total: 581,730 km^{2} (224,610 sq mi)
  - Land: 97.42%
  - Water: 2.58%
- Borders: Total land borders: 4,374.15 km (2,717.97 mi); Namibia: 1,544 km (959 mi); South Africa: 1,969 km (1,223 mi); Zambia: 0.15 km (0.093 mi); Zimbabwe: 834 km (518 mi)
- Highest point: Monalanong Hill 1,492.12 m (4,895 ft)
- Lowest point: Junction of the Limpopo and Shashe Rivers 513 m (1,683 ft)

Botswana is a landlocked country located in Southern Africa, north of South Africa. Botswana occupies an area of 581,730 square kilometres (224,610 mi^{2}). Botswana has land boundaries of combined length 4,347.15 kilometres (2,701.19 mi), of which the constituent boundaries are shared with Namibia, for 1,544 km (959 mi); South Africa 1,969 km (1,223 mi); Zimbabwe, 834 km (518 mi) and Zambia, 0.15 km (0.093 mi). Much of the population of Botswana is concentrated in the eastern part of the country.

Sunshine totals are high all year round although winter is the sunniest period. The whole country is windy and dusty during the dry season.

== Area and borders ==
Botswana is a landlocked country which has a land area covering 581,730 square kilometres (224,610 mi^{2}), with 15,000 square kilometres (5,800 mi^{2}) being water from the Okavango Delta; making it the 48th largest country in the world. The physical geography of Botswana is defined by its location—it is described as a part of Southern Africa. Botswana borders Namibia (for 1,544 km (959 mi)) to the north and west, South Africa for 1,969 km (1,223 mi) to the south and west, Zambia for 0.15 km (0.093 mi) in the north and Zimbabwe for 834 km (518 mi) to the northeast. It lies mostly between latitudes 17° and 27° S and longitudes 13° and 20° E.

Botswana gets its borders from colonial-era agreements made by the British Empire in the late 19th century when the country was established as the Bechuanaland Protectorate in 1885. The specific boundaries were standardized through Anglo-German and Anglo-Portuguese treaties, with some borders being defined by rivers. The point where the borders of Botswana, Namibia, Zambia, and Zimbabwe meet at the Chobe River has never been precisely determined.

Length of land borders of Botswana
Country	Length
Namibia	1,544 km (959 mi)
South Africa	1,969 km (1,223 mi)
Zambia	0.15 km (0.093 mi)
Zimbabwe	834 km (518 mi)
Total	4,347.15 km (2,701.19 mi)

=== Extreme points ===
The geographical extreme points of Botswana are Monalanong Hill as the northernmost point and the junction of the Limpopo and Shashe Rivers.

Extreme points of Botswana
Point	Name	District	Note	Ref
Highest	Monalanong Hill	Southern	1,492.12 m (4,895.4 ft) above sea level, 24°50′27″S 25°39′54″E	
Lowest	Junction of the Limpopo and Shashe Rivers	Central	513 m (1,683 ft) above sea level, 22°11′44″S 29°22′24″E	

=== Maritime claims ===
Botswana has no maritime claims since it is landlocked.

=== Border disputes ===
In 1992, the uninhabited Sedudu island sparked a border dispute between Botswana and Namibia due to the imprecise wording of the agreement concerning the northern boundary between the colonial powers of Germany and the United Kingdom which settled the geographic interests between German South-West Africa and the Bechuanaland Protectorate in the Heligoland-Zanzibar Treaty signed on July 1, 1890. The island is located in the Cuando River, which is considered a part of the border between two countries. Judges at the International Court of Justice ruled that the island belonged to Botswana in December 1999.

== Physical geography ==
Botswana's land is predominantly flat to gently undulating tableland, although there is some hilly country, where mining is carried out. The Kalahari Desert is in the central and the southwest. The Okavango Delta, one of the world's largest inland deltas, is in the northwest and the Makgadikgadi Pans, a large salt pan lies in the north-central area. The Makgadikgadi has been established as an early habitation area for primitive man; This large seasonal wetland is composed of several large component pans, the largest being Nwetwe Pan, Sua Pan and Nxai Pan. Botswana's lowest elevation point is at the junction of the Limpopo and Shashe Rivers, at a height of 513 m (1,683 ft). The highest point is Monalanong Hill, at 1,492.12 m (4,895.4 ft). The country is divided into four drainage regions, which are sometimes indistinct due to the arid nature of the climate:

- the Chobe River on the border with the Caprivi Strip of Namibia together with a small adjacent swampy area is part of the Zambezi basin;
- most of the north and central region of the country is part of the Okavango inland drainage basin;
- the easternmost part of the country falls into the Limpopo drainage basin;
- the southern and southwestern regions, which are the driest of all, are drained by the Molopo river along the South African border and the Nossob river through the Kalahari Gemsbok National Park, and are technically part of the basin of the Orange River. None of these rivers normally flows as far as the Orange, however. (The last recorded confluence was in the 1880s.)

Except for the Chobe, Okavango, Boteti and Limpopo rivers, most of Botswana's rivers cease to flow during the dry and early rainy seasons. In Botswana forest cover is around 27% of the total land area, equivalent to 15,254,700 hectares (ha) of forest in 2020, down from 18,803,700 hectares (ha) in 1990. In 2020, naturally regenerating forest covered 15,254,700 hectares, of the naturally regenerating forest 0% was reported to be primary forest (consisting of native tree species with no clearly visible indications of human activity) and around 11% of the forest area was found within protected areas. For the year 2015, 24% of the forest area was reported to be under public ownership and 76% private ownership.

=== Topography ===
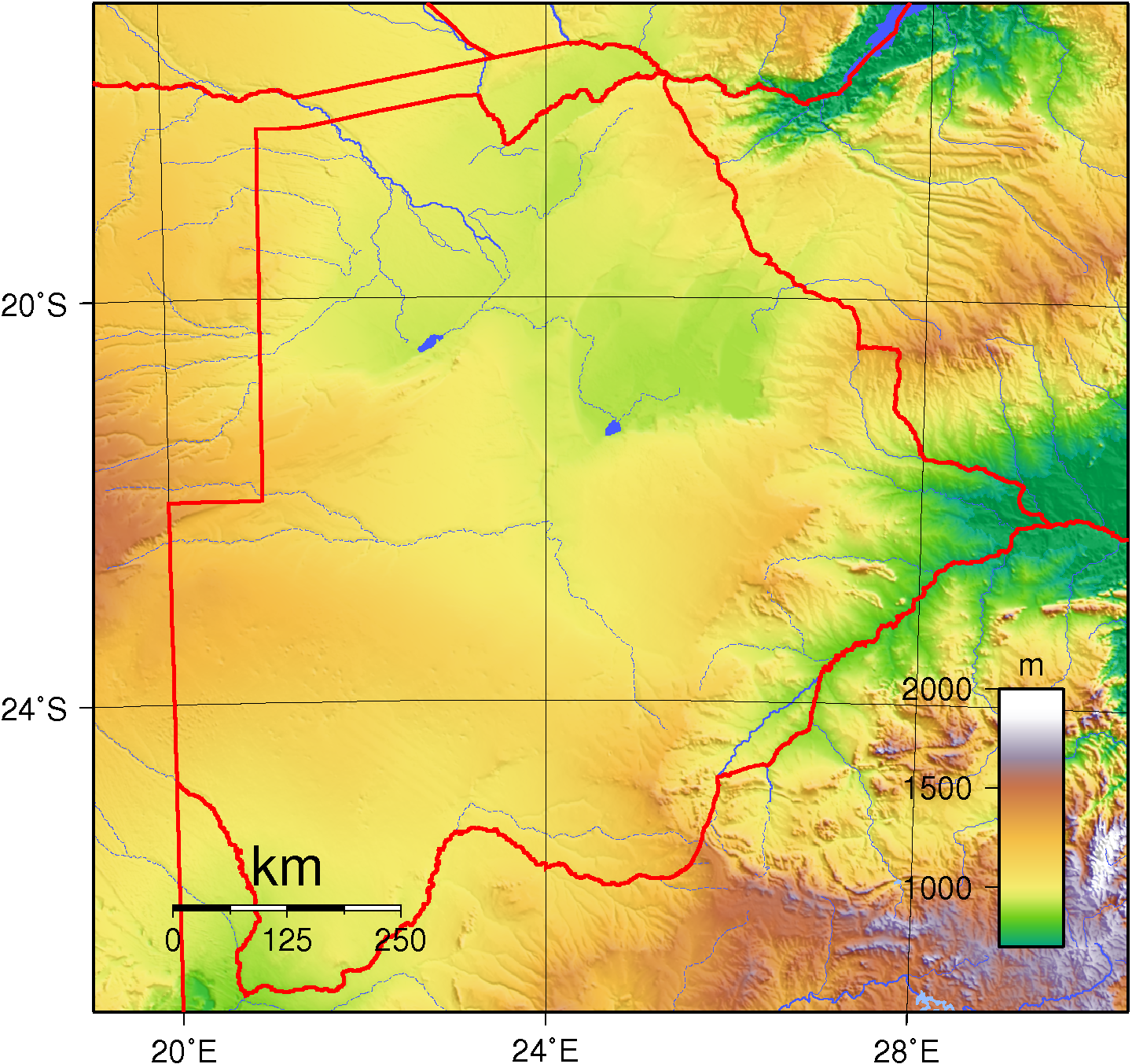
Elevation map of Botswana

=== Climate ===
Botswana map of Köppen climate classification zones

Botswana is semi-arid, due to the short rain season. However, the relatively high altitude of the country and its continental situation gives it a subtropical climate. The country is remote from moisture-laden air flows for most of the year. The dry season lasts from April to October in the south and to November in the north where rainfall totals are higher. The south of the country is most exposed to cold winds during the winter period (early May to late August) when average temperatures are around 14 °C (57.2 °F). The whole country has hot summers with average temperatures around 26 °C (78.8 °F). Sunshine totals are high all year round although winter is the sunniest period. The whole country is windy and dusty during the dry season.

Climate data for Gaborone (Sir Seretse Khama Airport, 1981–2010 normals)
Month	Jan	Feb	Mar	Apr	May	Jun	Jul	Aug	Sep	Oct	Nov	Dec	Year
Record high °C (°F)	39 (103)	40 (104)	39 (102)	37 (98)	33 (91)	29 (84)	28 (83)	33 (91)	39 (103)	38 (100)	40 (104)	39 (103)	40 (104)
Mean daily maximum °C (°F)	32.7 (90.9)	32.1 (89.8)	30.8 (87.4)	28.4 (83.1)	25.6 (78.1)	23.1 (73.6)	22.9 (73.2)	26.2 (79.2)	30.0 (86.0)	32.0 (89.6)	32.3 (90.1)	32.5 (90.5)	29.1 (84.4)
Daily mean °C (°F)	25.7 (78.3)	25.2 (77.4)	23.7 (74.7)	20.6 (69.1)	16.8 (62.2)	13.7 (56.7)	13.5 (56.3)	16.9 (62.4)	21.2 (70.2)	24.0 (75.2)	24.7 (76.5)	25.3 (77.5)	20.9 (69.6)
Mean daily minimum °C (°F)	19.7 (67.5)	19.3 (66.7)	17.4 (63.3)	13.5 (56.3)	8.3 (46.9)	5.0 (41.0)	4.4 (39.9)	7.5 (45.5)	12.3 (54.1)	16.3 (61.3)	17.7 (63.9)	18.8 (65.8)	13.4 (56.1)
Record low °C (°F)	14 (57)	13 (55)	11 (52)	0 (32)	−1 (30)	−1 (30)	−2 (28)	0 (32)	5 (41)	7 (45)	8 (46)	11 (52)	−2 (28)
Average precipitation mm (inches)	143 (5.6)	82 (3.2)	74 (2.9)	30 (1.2)	8.3 (0.33)	7.5 (0.30)	1 (0.0)	0.9 (0.04)	5.8 (0.23)	5.8 (0.23)	58 (2.3)	71 (2.8)	487.3 (19.13)
Average precipitation days	6	5	5	3	2	1	1	1	2	4	5	6	41
Source 1: African Regional Climate Centre
Source 2: Weatherbase (records)

== Environment ==
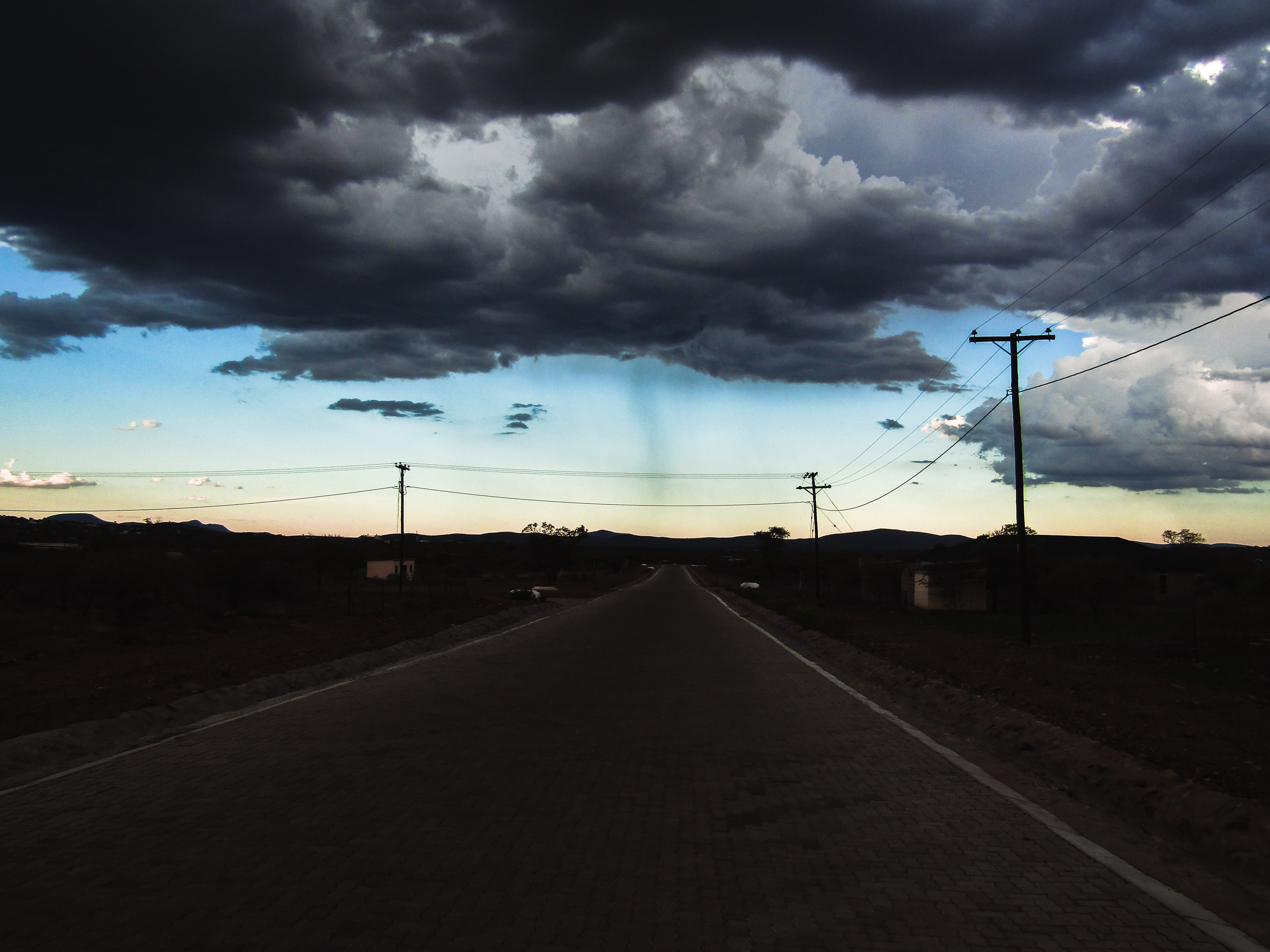
Rain clouds over Serowe January 2019

Current environmental issues in Botswana are overgrazing, desertification and the existence of only limited fresh water resources.

Research from scientists has found that the common practice of overstocking cattle to cope with drought losses actually depletes scarce biomass, making ecosystems more vulnerable. The study of the district predicts that by 2050 the cycle of mild drought is likely to become shorter —18 months instead of two years—due to climate change.

=== Tree cover extent and loss ===
Global Forest Watch publishes annual estimates of tree cover loss and 2000 tree cover extent derived from time-series analysis of Landsat satellite imagery in the Global Forest Change dataset. In this framework, tree cover refers to vegetation taller than 5 m (including natural forests and tree plantations), and tree cover loss is defined as the complete removal of tree cover canopy for a given year, regardless of cause.

For Botswana, country statistics report cumulative tree cover loss of 512 ha (5.12 km^{2}) from 2001 to 2024 (about 2.5% of its 2000 tree cover area). For tree cover density greater than 30%, country statistics report a 2000 tree cover extent of 20,328 ha (203.28 km^{2}). The charts and table below display this data. In simple terms, the annual loss number is the area where tree cover disappeared in that year, and the extent number shows what remains of the 2000 tree cover baseline after subtracting cumulative loss. Forest regrowth is not included in the dataset.

Annual tree cover loss in Botswana, 2001–2024. View chart definition.
Tree cover extent in 2000 minus cumulative tree cover loss in Botswana, 2001–2024 (loss-only residual; does not account for gain). View chart definition.

Annual tree cover extent and loss
Year	Tree cover extent (km2) (Note: This residual measure does not include forest regrowth.)	Annual tree cover loss (km2)
2001	201.97	1.31
2002	201.74	0.23
2003	201.66	0.08
2004	201.15	0.51
2005	200.66	0.49
2006	200.26	0.40
2007	199.92	0.34
2008	199.65	0.27
2009	199.24	0.41
2010	198.94	0.30
2011	198.73	0.21
2012	198.57	0.16
2013	198.43	0.14
2014	198.28	0.15
2015	198.28	0.00
2016	198.27	0.01
2017	198.26	0.01
2018	198.24	0.02
2019	198.24	0.00
2020	198.22	0.02
2021	198.21	0.01
2022	198.19	0.02
2023	198.17	0.02
2024	198.16	0.01

== International agreements ==
Botswana is a party to the following international agreements: Biodiversity, Climate Change, Desertification, Endangered Species, Hazardous Wastes, Law of the Sea, Nuclear Test Organization, Ozone Layer Protection and Wetlands.
