= List of ecoregions in Botswana =

The following is a list of ecoregions in Botswana, according to the Worldwide Fund for Nature (WWF).

== Terrestrial ecoregions ==
=== Tropical and subtropical grasslands, savannas, and shrublands ===
- Kalahari Acacia-Baikiaea woodlands
- Southern Africa bushveld
- Zambezian Baikiaea woodlands
- Zambezian and mopane woodlands

=== Flooded grasslands and savannas ===
- Zambezian flooded grasslands
- Zambezian halophytics

=== Deserts and xeric shrublands ===
- Kalahari xeric savanna

== Freshwater ecoregions ==
=== Zambezi ===
- Kalahari
- Okavango floodplains
- Upper Zambezi floodplains

=== Southern Temperate ===
- Western Orange
