= Botswana Telecommunications Authority =

Former telecommunications commission in Botswana

Agency overview
- Formed: 1996
- 2013
- Dissolved: 2013
- Jurisdiction: Government of Botswana
- Headquarters: 206/207 Independence Avenue, Gaborone
- Minister responsible: Hon. Mr. Frank J Ramsden
- Agency executive: Dr. Botswiri Tsheko, Chairman
- Website: www.bta.org.bw

Botswana Telecommunications Authority (BTA) is a dissolved independent commission that was responsible for regulating all matters related to telecommunications (wire, cellular, satellite and cable), postal services of Botswana and has been succeeded by Botswana Communications Regulatory Authority. The Minister appoints all five board members, who serve on a part-time basis. The BTA is mandated to promote the development and provision of efficient telecommunications and broadcasting services in Botswana, under the terms of the Telecommunications Act 15 of 1996. There have been legal disputes between the BTA and licensed operators, springing from issues related to interconnection and pricing.

== History ==
Botswana Telecommunications Corporation (BTC) was established in 1980 to provide, develop, operate and manage Botswana's national and international telecommunications services. The Botswana government holds 100 percent equity in the BTC. Botswana's history of sector reform dates to 1980, when the BTC was created through the Botswana Telecommunications Act. The act established the BTC as a monopoly of telecommunications services and separated it from Posts (which continued to operate as a government department).

Following public concerns regarding unsatisfactory telecommunications services during the 1990s (including lack of competition in providing services, limited private-sector participation, lack of transparency in decision-making and lack of a platform for consumer complaints), the government began public consultations to liberalise the telecommunications market. In 1992 the Ministry of Works, Transport and Communications was tasked with policy transformation. The consultations culminated in the approval of the 1995 Telecommunications Policy for Botswana: the blueprint for restructuring the telecommunications sector, which embodied principles which guided the form of the government monopoly. The transformation process led to the formation of the BTA under the Telecommunications Act 1996, as passed in the National Assembly on 1 August 1996.

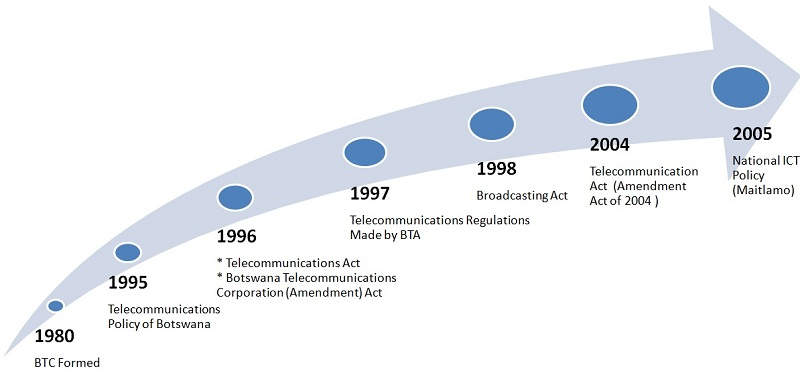

== Structure and functions ==
The board, as established by section four of the Telecommunications Act of 1996, is responsible for the overall strategic direction of the BTA and not involved in itsdaily management. It oversees the functions and approves policy and regulations. The board also approves the annual budget and additional expenditures not included in the annual budget.

== Mandate and purpose ==
The following legislation prescribes the powers and functions of the BTA:

- The Botswana Constitution of commencing (L.N. 83 of 1966); L.N. 83, 1966; Act 30, 1969; Act 43, 1969; Act 25, 1970; Act 28, 1972; Act 24, 1973; Act 28, 1978; S.I. 25, 1980; Act 32, 1982; Act 1, 1983; Act 22, 1987; S.I. 37, 1991; Act 27, 1992; S.I. 51, 1993; S.I. 119, 1993; Act 16, 1997; Act 18, 1997; Act 1, 1999; Act 2, 2002; Act 12, 2002; Act 9, 2005; S.I. 91, 2006.
- The Telecommunications Act of 1996 (No.15 of 1996)
- The Broadcasting Act of 1999 (No.6 of 1996)
- Telecommunications Regulations of 1997 (Chapter 72:03)
- Telecommunication Act Amendment Act 2004 (No.15 of 2004)

=== Powers and functions ===
The aforementioned acts prescribe the powers and functions of BTA as follows:

Botswana Constitution

Section 12 protects freedom of expression. It also provides for an exemption, in that it states in subsection 12(2) that nothing contained in (or done under) the Telecommunications Act of 1996 or any law shall be held to be inconsistent with (or in contravention of) this section, to the extent that the law in question makes provision regulating the technical administration or the technical operation of telephony, telegraphy, posts, wireless, broadcasting or television.

Telecommunications Act of 1996

In terms of section 17, BTA's functions and powers are:

- The supervision and promotion of efficient telecommunications services in Botswana
- Promoting the interest of the consumers, purchasers and users in respect of prices, quality, variety of such services and equipment or terminal equipment
- Promoting and maintaining competition
- Setting the principles with regards to tariffs in terms of section 18
- Settlement of disputes in terms section 19
- Issue licences for telecommunications services in terms of sections 28 and 29
- Radio licences in terms of section 42
- Radio frequency management, in terms of section 43

Telecommunications Regulations

In terms of the regulations:

- The BTA sets the numbering system in terms of Regulation Four.
- The BTA allocates numbering and address capacity in terms of Regulation Five
- The BTA issues type approval of equipment in terms of Regulation 24

Broadcasting Act of 1999

In terms of section nine, the BTA serves as the secretariat of the Botswana National Broadcasting Board (NBB). In terms of this role, the BTA:

- Shall discharge such functions of the NBB as may be delegated to it
- Shall designate to the NBB such officers of the BTA as may be necessary for the performance of the functions of the NBB and the administration of the Act
- Shall advise the NBB on technical matters in relation to its functions
- Regulations of the NBB may provide for the payment of any expenses or costs incurred by it in the performance of its functions under the act.

In terms of section 12(2), BTA applications for broadcasting or re-broadcasting licences shall be made to the BTA as the secretariat; in terms of section 13, the NBB issues the licences.

In terms of section 15, any notices of changes to the particulars of a licence (especially with regard to proprietorship) or the acquisition of any interest shall be made to the BTA but approved by the NBB.

Telecommunication Amendment Act of 2004

The object of the Act is to amend the Telecommunications Act of 1996 as follows:

- In section two, by separating the position of Chief Executive Officer of the BTA from that of the Chairperson of the Board
- In section three, by providing for the submission, by the BTA, of five-year strategic plans and annual plans to the Minister
- In section four, by giving the Minister the power to determine the use of surplus funds and properties that accrue to the BTA
- In section five, by giving the Minister the power to make regulations, on the recommendation of the Board
- In section six, by giving the Minister the power to set licensing fees, which are currently prescribed by the BTA
- In section seven, by providing for all decisions on the licensing of fixed line and cellular telephone services to be approved by the Minister

=== Core purposes ===
Further core purposes of the BTA are:

- Setting industry standards
- Setting tariffs and appropriate guidelines
- Acting as responsible, accountable referee in industry to facilitate
- Investment and universal service
- Facilitating and promoting an environment that ensures protection of end-users
- To ensure compliance with the communication service regulatory framework through the management and monitoring of broadcast content and terms and licence conditions
- To research communications regulation, best practice communications services and industry performance so as to advise government on policy formulation
- Establish communications regulatory policies
- Inform industry and consumers
- To promote and encourage efficient communication services so as to attract investment
- To promote capacity building within communications industry
- To represent Botswana's interests in the international communications arena

== Highlights and controversies ==
=== Legal disputes ===
The BTA was involved in the following cases:

- 1999: The BTA resolved its first interconnection dispute between the Botswana Telecommunications Corporation (BTC) and the two major cellular operators in Botswana, Mascom Wireless and Vista Cellular in BTA Ruling No. 1 of 1999. The directive was the agreement of interconnect rates between the providers; the no-charge directive for emergency services, and the agreement of wholesale charges for leased lines.
- 2000: In December 2000, the BTA ordered the BTC to make leased lines available equally to private ISPs and Botsnet. In March, after the BTA threatened a lawsuit, the BTC agreed to provide the leased lines. A similar dispute involving USKO and the BTC was also resolved in 2000.
- 2003: Following a deadlock, Mascom Wireless and Botswana Telecommunications Corporation (BTC) jointly signed a declaration of interconnection dispute dated 5 July 2002. The dispute was submitted to the Botswana Telecommunications Authority (BTA) for determination. The legal principle for determining interconnection charges is the "fair and reasonable" test. Interconnection charges may be deemed to be fair and reasonable if they approximate costs, or if they are based on efficiency criteria.
- 2007: Court ruling in dispute between Botswana Telecommunication Authority and Orange. The High Court of Appeal of Botswana has ruled that the Botswana Telecommunications Authority (BTA) should no longer receive tax revenues from mobile phone operators from the sale of scratch cards and free airtime offered by the mobile operators to their customers.

=== Key sector indicators ===
Key Indicators - ITU 2008
Statistic	Per 100 inhabitants
Fixed telephone lines	7.41
Mobile cellular subscriptions	77.34
Internet users	6.25
Computers	6.25
Broadband Internet subscribers	0.46
TV sets	4.35
Radio sets	75.58

== See also ==
- Botswana Communications Regulatory Authority
- List of telecommunications regulatory bodies
- List of Operators in Botswana
- National Telecommunications Regulatory Authority
- Ethiopian Telecommunication Agency
- Telecom Regulatory Authority of India
