= Monalanong Hill =

Mountain in Botswana

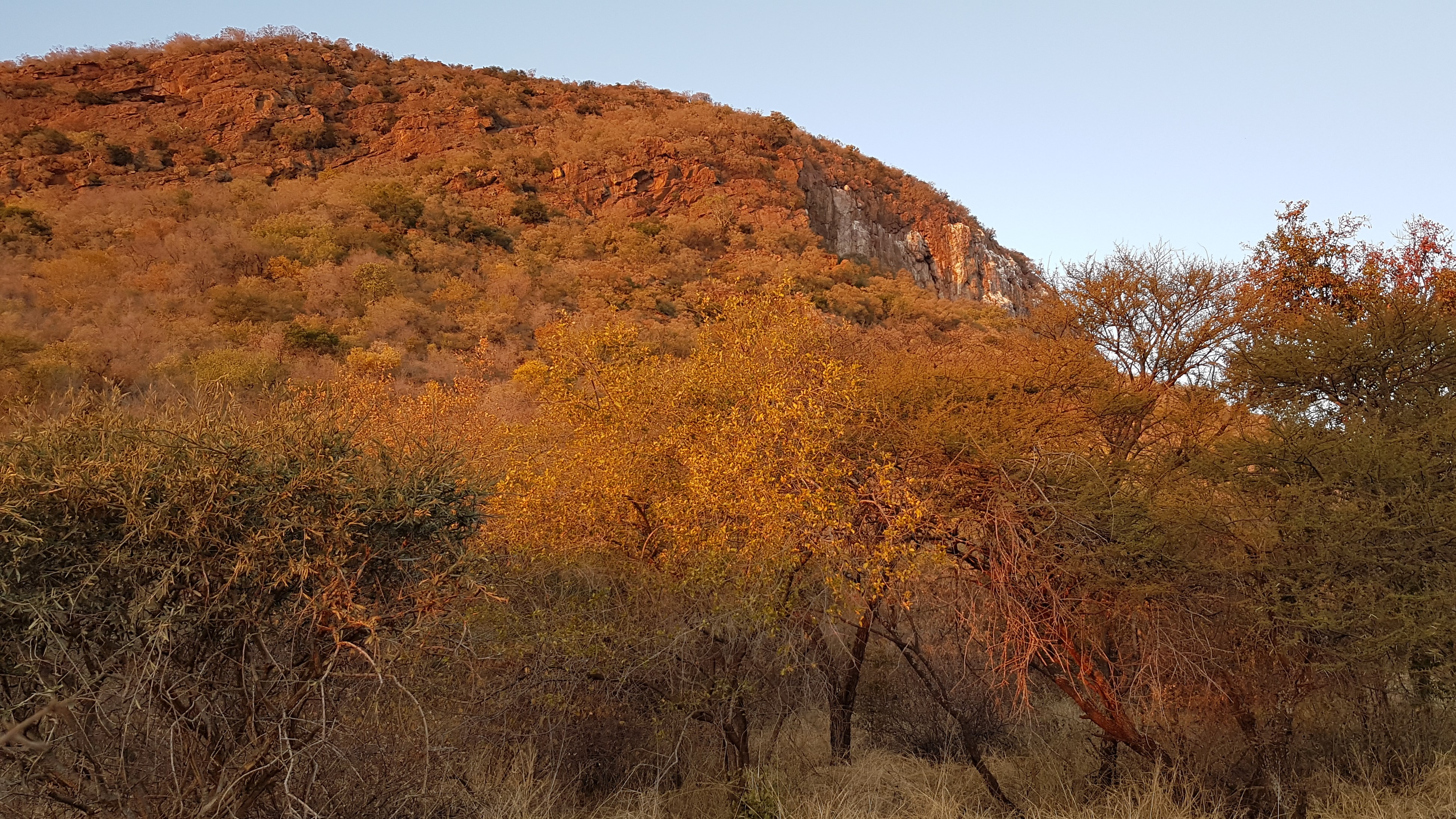

Highest point
- Elevation: 1,494 m (4,902 ft)
- Listing: Country high point
- Coordinates: 24°50′27″S 25°39′54″E

Geography
- Location within Botswana
- Location: Botswana

Monalanong Hill is a hill often considered the highest hill of Botswana, with the highest point derived from SRTM data of 1,494 metres (4,900 feet).

The Otse Hill (at a reported altitude of 1,491 metres - 4,891 feet) or the Tsodilo Hills (at an altitude of about 1,400 metres - 4,593 feet) are also often cited as the highest point in Botswana.
