= Demographics of Botswana =

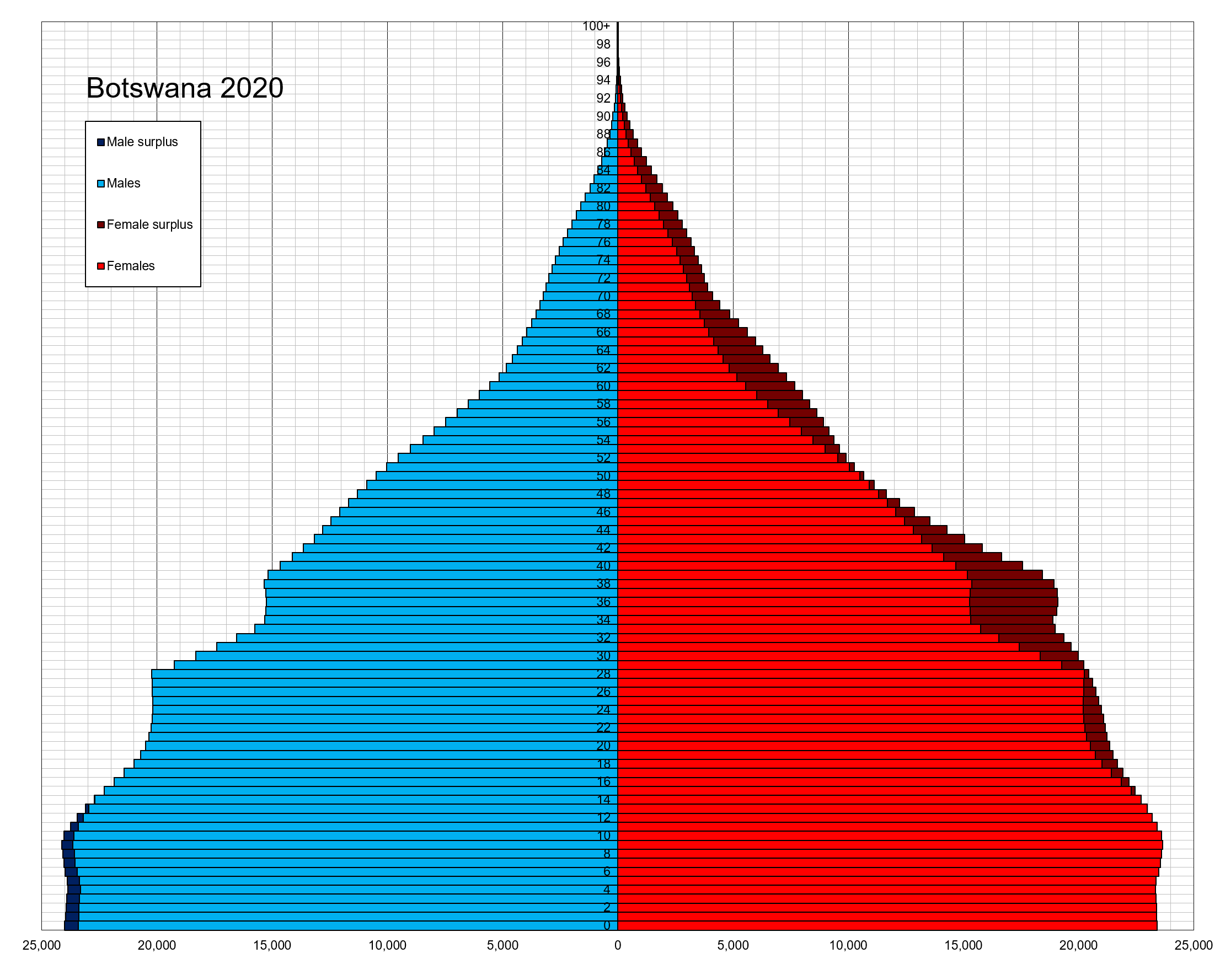
- Population pyramid of Botswana in 2020
- Population: 2,359,609 (2022)
- Growth rate: 1.4% (2022 est.)
- Birth rate: 20.28 births/1,000 population (2022 est.)
- Death rate: 9.05 deaths/1,000 population (2022 est.)
- Life expectancy: 65.64 years
  - male: 63.6 years
  - female: 67.74 years
- Fertility rate: 1.96 children born/woman (2024)
- Infant mortality: 25.18 deaths/1,000 live births
- Net migration rate: 2.81 migrant(s)/1,000 population (2022 est.)

Age structure
- 0–14 years: 30.54%
- 65 and over: 5.56%

Sex ratio
- Total: 0.92 male(s)/female (2022 est.)
- At birth: 1.03 male(s)/female
- Under 15: 1.02 male(s)/female
- 65 and over: 0.6 male(s)/female

Nationality
- Nationality: Motswana
- Major ethnic: Tswana (79%)
- Minor ethnic: Kalanga (11%)

Demographic features of the population of Botswana include population density, ethnicity, education level, health of the populace, economic status, religious affiliations and other aspects.

Demographics of Botswana, Data of FAO, year 2008; Number of inhabitants in thousands.

Botswana, like many nations in southern Africa, suffers from a high HIV infection rate, estimated among adults ages 15 to 49 to be 20.7%.

== Census results ==
Botswana Population and Housing Census
Year	Pop.	±% p.a.
1904	120,776	—
1911	124,350	+0.42%
1921	152,983	+2.09%
1936	265,756	+3.75%
1946	296,310	+1.09%
1956	309,175	+0.43%
1964	549,510	+7.45%
1971	596,994	+1.19%
1981	941,027	+4.66%
1991	1,326,796	+3.50%
2001	1,680,863	+2.39%
2011	2,024,904	+1.88%
2022	2,359,609	+1.40%

=== Bechuanaland Protectorate ===
The seven censuses of Botswana before its independence happened irregularly. Due to the Anglo-Boer War, the first census of Bechuanaland Protectorate, originally set to occur in 1901, took place on 17 April 1904. The 1931 census was postponed to 1936 because of the Great Depression. The early censuses were unreliable and took several years to tabulate; the results were outdated by the time they were calculated.

=== Post-independence ===
There have been six censuses after the independence of Botswana, each occurring every ten years in the year ending in 1 (i.e. 1971, 1981, 1991, 2001, 2011 and 2022). The 1971 census was the first census in Botswana to use de facto enumeration; this method counts people based on how many people spent census night at a specific location. Previously, the citizens were counted based on their usual place of residence. The 2001 census was the first census in Botswana to comply with the SADC 2000 Census Project, the guidelines of which unify the demographic statistics in southern Africa. The 2011 Census was the fifth census after independence the 2011 Botswana Population and Housing Census, it occurred in August 2011. The most recent sixth and most recent census is the 2022 Population and Housing Census which was carried out in April 2022.

== UN estimates ==
According to the 2022 revision of the World Population Prospects the total population was 2,588,423 in 2021, compared to only 413,000 in 1950. The proportion of children below the age of 15 in 2020 was about 33.4%, 62.1% were between 15 and 65 years of age, while 4.5% of the population were 65 years or older.

Population by age group
Year	Total	0–14 (%)	15–64 (%)	65+ (%)
1950	413 000	40.9	54.8	4.4
1955	463 000	41.7	53.9	4.3
1960	503 000	43.6	52.1	4.3
1965	560 000	46.8	49.3	4.0
1970	628 000	47.8	48.3	3.9
1975	741 000	48.0	48.5	3.5
1980	898 000	48.5	48.1	3.4
1985	1 070 000	47.9	49.0	3.1
1990	1 287 000	45.0	51.7	3.3
1995	1 469 000	42.2	54.6	3.3
2000	1 643 000	38.7	58.1	3.3
2005	1 799 000	36.5	60.3	3.1
2010	1 987 000	35.0	61.7	3.3
2015	2 121 000	34.9	61.2	3.8
2020	2 352 000	33.4	62.1	4.5

Population by Sex and Age Group (Census 9.VIII.2011):

Age group	Male	Female	Total	%
Total	988 957	1 035 947	2 024 904	100
0–4	119 999	117 315	237 314	11.72
5–9	108 544	106 618	215 162	10.63
10–14	104 419	102 875	207 294	10.24
15–19	104 818	105 928	210 746	10.41
20–24	97 249	103 101	200 350	9.89
25–29	101 194	106 658	207 852	10.26
30–34	84 515	86 027	170 542	8.42
35–39	68 435	66 784	135 219	6.68
40–44	48 767	50 530	99 297	4.90
45–49	37 881	44 380	82 261	4.06
50–54	29 742	36 620	66 362	3.28
55–59	24 368	29 681	54 049	2.67
60–64	17 344	20 240	37 584	1.86
65–69	12 243	15 504	27 747	1.37
70–74	9 464	12 797	22 261	1.10
75–79	6 968	10 924	17 892	0.88
80–84	4 875	8 344	13 219	0.65
85–89	2 825	5 422	8 247	0.41
90–94	1 377	2 544	3 921	0.19
95+	3 930	3 655	7 585	0.37
Age group	Male	Female	Total	Percent
0–14	332 962	326 808	659 770	32.58
15–64	614 313	649 949	1 264 262	62.44
65+	41 682	59 190	100 872	4.98

Population Estimates by Sex and Age Group (01.VII.2020) (Based on the results of the 2011 Population Census.):

Age group	Male	Female	Total	%
Total	1 171 507	1 227 171	2 398 679	100
0–4	142 150	138 970	281 120	11.72
5–9	128 580	126 298	254 879	10.63
10–14	123 694	121 865	245 558	10.24
15–19	124 166	125 481	249 647	10.41
20–24	115 200	122 132	237 332	9.89
25–29	119 873	126 346	246 219	10.26
30–34	100 116	101 907	202 022	8.42
35–39	81 067	79 112	160 179	6.68
40–44	57 769	59 857	117 626	4.90
45–49	44 873	52 572	97 445	4.06
50–54	35 232	43 380	78 612	3.28
55–59	28 866	35 160	64 026	2.67
60–64	20 546	23 976	44 522	1.86
65–69	14 503	18 366	32 869	1.37
70–74	11 211	15 159	26 370	1.10
75–79	8 254	12 940	21 195	0.88
80–84	5 775	9 884	15 659	0.65
85–89	3 346	6 423	9 769	0.41
90–94	1 631	3 014	4 645	0.19
95+	4 655	4 330	8 985	0.37
Age group	Male	Female	Total	Percent
0–14	394 424	387 133	781 557	32.58
15–64	727 708	769 922	1 497 630	62.44
65+	49 375	70 116	119 491	4.98

Population by Sex and Age Group (Census 18.III.2022):

Age group	Male	Female	Total	%
Total	1 188 544	1 209 006	2 397 550	100
0–4	137 857	136 911	274 768	11.46
5–9	125 078	124 428	249 506	10.41
10–14	120 559	120 060	240 619	10.04
15–19	123 039	123 624	246 663	10.29
20–24	117 812	120 325	238 137	9.93
25–29	122 117	124 476	246 593	10.29
30–34	99 674	100 398	200 072	8.34
35–39	78 529	77 940	156 469	6.53
40–44	58 190	58 971	117 161	4.89
45–49	49 091	51 794	100 885	4.21
50–54	39 891	42 738	82 629	3.45
55–59	32 428	34 639	67 067	2.80
60–64	22 416	23 621	46 037	1.92
65–69	16 747	18 095	34 842	1.45
70–74	13 562	14 935	28 497	1.19
75–79	11 124	12 749	23 873	1.00
80–84	8 103	9 738	17 841	0.74
85–89	5 264	6 328	11 592	0.48
90–94	2 491	2 970	5 461	0.23
95+	4 572	4 266	8 838	0.37
Age group	Male	Female	Total	Percent
0–14	383 494	381 399	764 893	31.90
15–64	743 187	758 526	1 501 713	62.64
65+	61 863	69 081	130 944	5.46

== Vital statistics ==
=== United Nations estimates ===
Registration of vital events in Botswana is not complete. The Population Department of the United Nations prepared the following estimates. Population estimates account for under numeration in population censuses.

Year	Mid-year population	Live births	Deaths	Natural change	Crude birth rate	Crude death rate	Natural change	Total fertility rate (TFR)	Infant mortality (per 1000 live births)	Life expectancy (in years)
1950	413,000	19,000	8,000	10,000	45.4	20.3	25.0	6.43	138.1	44.95
1951	423,000	19,000	9,000	11,000	45.6	20.3	25.3	6.43	136.4	45.25
1952	433,000	20,000	9,000	11,000	45.9	19.9	25.9	6.44	132.8	45.86
1953	442,000	21,000	9,000	12,000	46.4	19.5	26.8	6.49	129.3	46.46
1954	452,000	21,000	9,000	13,000	46.8	19.2	27.7	6.53	125.9	47.06
1955	462,000	22,000	9,000	13,000	47.2	18.8	28.4	6.56	122.6	47.65
1956	471,000	22,000	9,000	14,000	47.5	18.4	29.1	6.60	119.5	48.22
1957	481,000	23,000	9,000	14,000	47.7	18.1	29.7	6.65	116.5	48.74
1958	491,000	24,000	9,000	15,000	47.6	17.6	30.0	6.65	113.4	49.32
1959	502,000	24,000	9,000	15,000	47.5	17.2	30.3	6.65	110.6	49.84
1960	513,000	24,000	9,000	16,000	47.1	16.8	30.3	6.63	107.8	50.37
1961	524,000	25,000	9,000	16,000	46.6	16.3	30.3	6.60	105.0	50.89
1962	536,000	25,000	9,000	16,000	46.1	15.8	30.3	6.57	102.3	51.39
1963	549,000	25,000	8,000	17,000	46.2	15.4	30.8	6.63	99.7	51.88
1964	562,000	26,000	8,000	18,000	46.2	15.0	31.2	6.69	97.2	52.35
1965	571,000	27,000	8,000	18,000	45.9	14.6	31.3	6.69	94.8	52.81
1966	575,000	27,000	8,000	18,000	45.8	14.3	31.5	6.69	92.4	53.26
1967	579,000	27,000	8,000	19,000	45.7	14.0	31.7	6.68	90.0	53.72
1968	583,000	27,000	8,000	19,000	45.7	13.7	32.0	6.67	87.6	54.19
1969	587,000	27,000	8,000	19,000	45.6	13.4	32.3	6.64	85.0	54.68
1970	592,000	27,000	8,000	20,000	45.7	13.0	32.7	6.62	82.3	55.20
1971	604,000	28,000	8,000	20,000	45.8	12.7	33.1	6.59	79.6	55.75
1972	627,000	29,000	8,000	21,000	46.0	12.2	33.8	6.59	76.6	56.30
1973	657,000	30,000	8,000	22,000	46.1	11.7	34.4	6.59	73.6	56.86
1974	692,000	32,000	8,000	24,000	46.3	11.3	35.0	6.59	70.5	57.42
1975	728,000	34,000	8,000	26,000	46.4	10.9	35.5	6.58	67.3	58.00
1976	766,000	35,000	8,000	27,000	46.4	10.4	36.0	6.56	64.1	58.58
1977	807,000	37,000	8,000	29,000	46.0	10.0	36.0	6.50	61.0	59.17
1978	849,000	39,000	8,000	30,000	45.7	9.6	36.1	6.44	57.9	59.69
1979	894,000	40,000	8,000	32,000	45.1	9.2	35.9	6.36	55.0	60.18
1980	939,000	42,000	8,000	33,000	44.5	8.9	35.6	6.25	52.3	60.65
1981	983,000	43,000	8,000	34,000	43.7	8.5	35.2	6.13	49.7	61.13
1982	1,023,000	43,000	8,000	35,000	42.5	8.2	34.3	5.93	47.2	61.57
1983	1,061,000	44,000	8,000	36,000	41.5	7.9	33.5	5.75	44.9	62.00
1984	1,099,000	45,000	8,000	36,000	40.6	7.7	32.9	5.58	42.8	62.36
1985	1,139,000	45,000	8,000	37,000	39.8	7.5	32.3	5.43	40.8	62.63
1986	1,179,000	46,000	9,000	37,000	39.0	7.4	31.6	5.27	39.1	62.68
1987	1,220,000	46,000	9,000	37,000	37.8	7.3	30.4	5.06	37.7	62.52
1988	1,261,000	46,000	10,000	36,000	36.5	7.6	28.9	4.85	37.3	61.76
1989	1,302,000	46,000	10,000	36,000	35.3	7.7	27.7	4.65	36.5	61.43
1990	1,341,000	46,000	11,000	35,000	34.4	8.0	26.4	4.51	36.9	60.53
1991	1,381,000	46,000	12,000	35,000	33.5	8.4	25.1	4.37	38.2	59.47
1992	1,421,000	47,000	13,000	34,000	33.2	8.9	24.2	4.25	40.2	58.35
1993	1,462,000	48,000	14,000	34,000	32.8	9.3	23.5	4.15	42.4	57.72
1994	1,504,000	48,000	15,000	33,000	32.2	10.0	22.2	4.02	44.9	56.15
1995	1,544,000	48,000	16,000	31,000	31.0	10.6	20.4	3.79	47.8	55.06
1996	1,582,000	47,000	17,000	30,000	29.9	11.0	18.9	3.57	50.2	54.36
1997	1,619,000	47,000	19,000	28,000	29.1	11.5	17.6	3.43	52.7	53.45
1998	1,656,000	48,000	20,000	28,000	29.0	12.1	16.9	3.36	54.7	52.52
1999	1,692,000	49,000	21,000	27,000	28.9	12.6	16.3	3.31	56.3	51.69
2000	1,727,000	50,000	23,000	27,000	29.0	13.1	15.8	3.29	57.3	51.01
2001	1,762,000	51,000	24,000	27,000	28.9	13.4	15.5	3.25	57.1	50.68
2002	1,795,000	51,000	24,000	27,000	28.5	13.5	14.9	3.17	56.0	50.63
2003	1,827,000	51,000	24,000	27,000	28.2	13.4	14.8	3.11	54.6	50.95
2004	1,859,000	52,000	24,000	28,000	28.1	13.1	15.1	3.06	52.5	51.62
2005	1,893,000	54,000	24,000	30,000	28.4	12.6	15.8	3.08	48.9	52.61
2006	1,929,000	55,000	23,000	32,000	28.6	11.9	16.8	3.11	46.0	53.92
2007	1,967,000	56,000	21,000	35,000	28.6	10.9	17.6	3.13	43.4	55.73
2008	2,007,000	57,000	21,000	36,000	28.4	10.3	18.2	3.13	42.7	57.12
2009	2,049,000	58,000	20,000	38,000	28.2	9.7	18.5	3.13	41.2	58.28
2010	2,092,000	58,000	19,000	40,000	27.9	8.9	19.0	3.13	38.6	60.01
2011	2,134,000	59,000	19,000	40,000	27.6	8.7	18.9	3.10	38.9	60.53
2012	2,175,000	60,000	19,000	41,000	27.4	8.7	18.7	3.07	38.2	60.80
2013	2,217,000	60,000	18,000	42,000	27.1	8.8	18.9	3.04	37.4	62.00
2014	2,260,000	61,000	18,000	43,000	26.8	8.4	18.8	3.03	37.8	62.61
2015	2,305,000	61,000	17,000	44,000	26.5	7.9	19.0	3.01	37.4	63.82
2016	2,352,000	61,000	16,000	45,000	26.3	7.5	19.3	2.99	37.1	65.46
2017	2,402,000	62,000	15,000	46,000	26.1	7.0	19.0	2.97	36.2	66.75
2018	2,451,000	62,000	17,000	45,000	25.9	6.7	19.2	2.94	35.6	65.42
2019	2,500,000	62,000	17,000	45,000	25.8	6.4	19.3	2.91	34.9	65.46
2020	2,546,000	62,000	18,000	44,000	25.5	6.3	19.3	2.86	34.2	65.65
2021	2,588,000	61,000	24,000	37,000	25.4	8.4	17.0	2.83	33.3	61.14
2022					25.3	5.8	19.4	2.78		
2023					24.7	5.7	19.0	2.73		
2024					24.4	5.7	18.6	2.70		
2025					23.9	5.7	18.1	2.66		

=== Registered births and deaths ===
Year	Population	Live births	Deaths	Natural increase	Crude birth rate	Crude death rate	Rate of natural increase	TFR
1964	514 876							
1971	574 094				45.3	13.7	31.6	6.5
1981	941 027	45 026	12 835	32 191	48.7	13.9	34.8	6.6
1991	1 326 796	52 351	15 221	37 130	39.3	11.5	27.8	4.2
1992	1 358 639	52 416	15 344	37 072	38.6	11.3	27.3	4.2
1993	1 391 245	52 437	15 578	36 859	37.7	11.2	26.5	4.1
1994	1 424 636	52 598	15 822	36 776	36.9	11.1	25.8	4.1
1995	1 458 828	52 759	15 926	36 833	33.7	11.0	22.7	4.1
1996	1 495 993	52 921	16 031	36 890	32.4	10.9	21.5	4.0
1997	1 533 393	53 083	16 137	36 946	32.3	10.8	21.5	4.0
1998	1 571 728	53 245	16 244	37 001	32.2	10.7	21.5	4.0
1999	1 611 021	53 407	16 352	37 055	32.1	10.6	21.5	3.9
2001	1 680 862	41 080	20 823	20 257	28.9	12.4	16.5	3.3
2002	1 667 487							
2003	1 691 390	41 206			24.4			
2004	1 711 334	37 947			22.2			
2005	1 727 372	46 945			27.2			
2006	1 739 556	44 050	19 088	24 962	29.8	11.2	18.6	3.2
2007	1 756 651	44 452			25.3			
2008	1 776 283	44 961			25.3			
2009	1 798 372	46 624			25.9			
2010	1 822 858	50 328			27.6			
2011	2 024 904	51 871	13 301	38 570	25.7	6.3	19.4	2.89
2012	2 068 529	50 048	12 270	37 778	24.2	5.9	18.3	
2013	2 110 050	49 839	11 967	37 872	23.6	5.6	18.0	
2014	2 149 255	47 478	12 177	35 301	22.1	5.6	16.5	
2015	2 185 903	57 480	13 030	44 450	26.3	6.0	20.3	
2016	2 219 732	54 267	12 825	41 442	24.4	5.8	18.6	
2017	2 254 021	52 358	12 386	39 972	23.2	5.5	17.7	3.1
2018	2 288 656	54 023	12 609	41 414	23.6	5.5	18.1	2.656
2019	2 323 493	54 100	13 185	40 015	23.3	5.7	17.6	2.648
2020	2 358 445	58 646	12 219	46 427	24.9	5.2	19.7	2.844
2021	2 393 396	50 962	17 590	33 372	21.1	7.3	13.8	2.478
2022	2 359 609	48 464	13 924	34 540	20.5	5.9	14.6	2.442
2023	2 392 644	46 352	13 694	32 658	19.4	5.7	13.7	2.314
2024	2 426 141	41 784	14 070	27 714	17.2	5.8	11.4	1.956

Source: Vital Statistics Report 2012.

View source data.
View source data.
View source data.
View source data.

=== Fertility ===
Years	1925	1926	1927	1928	1929	1930	1931	1932	1933	1934
Total Fertility Rate in Botswana	6.50	6.50	6.50	6.50	6.50	6.50	6.50	6.49	6.49	6.49

Years	1935	1936	1937	1938	1939	1940	1941	1942	1943	1944
Total Fertility Rate in Botswana	6.49	6.49	6.49	6.49	6.48	6.48	6.48	6.48	6.48	6.48

Years	1945	1946	1947	1948	1949
Total Fertility Rate in Botswana	6.48	6.47	6.47	6.47	6.47

=== Life expectancy at birth ===
Life expectancy from 1950 to 2020 (UN World Population Prospects):

Period	Life expectancy (years)
1950–1955	44.89
1955–1960	▲47.82
1960–1965	▲50.42
1965–1970	▲52.67
1970–1975	▲55.09
1975–1980	▲57.92
1980–1985	▲60.11
1985–1990	▲61.09
1990–1995	▼56.43
1995–2000	▼52.63
2000–2005	▼50.06
2005–2010	▲55.86
2010–2015	▲64.45
2015–2020	▲69.09

== Ethnic groups ==
Tswana 79%, Kalanga 11%, Basarwa 3%, Other 7% (including Kgalagadi, Indians and White people).

== Languages ==
Setswana 77.3%, Kalanga 7.4%, Sekgalagadi 3.4%, English 2.8%, Shona 2.0%, Sesarwa 1.7%, Sehambukushu 1.6%, Ndebele 1.0%, Others 2.8%. (2011 est.)

== Religions ==
Christian 79.1%, Badimo 4.1%, Other 1.4% (includes the Baháʼí Faith, Hindu, Islam, Rastafari), None 15.2%, Unspecified 0.3% (2011 est.)

== Migrants ==
According to the United Nations, there were 110,596 international migrants in Botswana in 2019. Their most common countries of origin were as follows:

International migrants in Botswana in 2019
Zimbabwe	64,477
South Africa	5,780
India	5,668
China	4,792
Zambia	4,429
Malawi	1,484
United Kingdom	1,320
Nigeria	1,238
Kenya	1,215
Democratic Republic of the Congo	1,133
Sri Lanka	992
Namibia	992
United States	923
Tanzania	818
Angola	782
Netherlands	640
Ireland	629
Eswatini	611
Mozambique	607

Source: United Nations"Migrant Stock by Origin and Destination". 2019.
