= The Patriot on Sunday =

- Type: Weekly
- Owner(s): The Patriot On Sunday Proprietary Limited; Mpho Balopi
- Founded: 2012
- Language: English
- Headquarters: Gaborone
- Website: www.thepatriot.co.bw

The Patriot on Sunday is a newspaper published in Botswana on Sundays. The newspaper was founded in 2012 and is partly owned by parliamentarian Mpho Balopi. The newspaper is indexed in AllAfrica.com. The newspaper was involved in a Freedom of the Press dispute with the Printing & Publishing Company Botswana because of a negative perspective on the ruling party.

== Ownership ==
The newspaper was owned by Botswana Democratic Party politician Mpho Balopi. He sold the media company to Sadique Kebonang. Keobonang handed over the ownership of the newspaper to journalist Mpho Dibeela, who is the sole shareholder and director.

== See also ==
- Botswana Guardian
- The Voice (Botswana)
