= Tourism in Botswana =

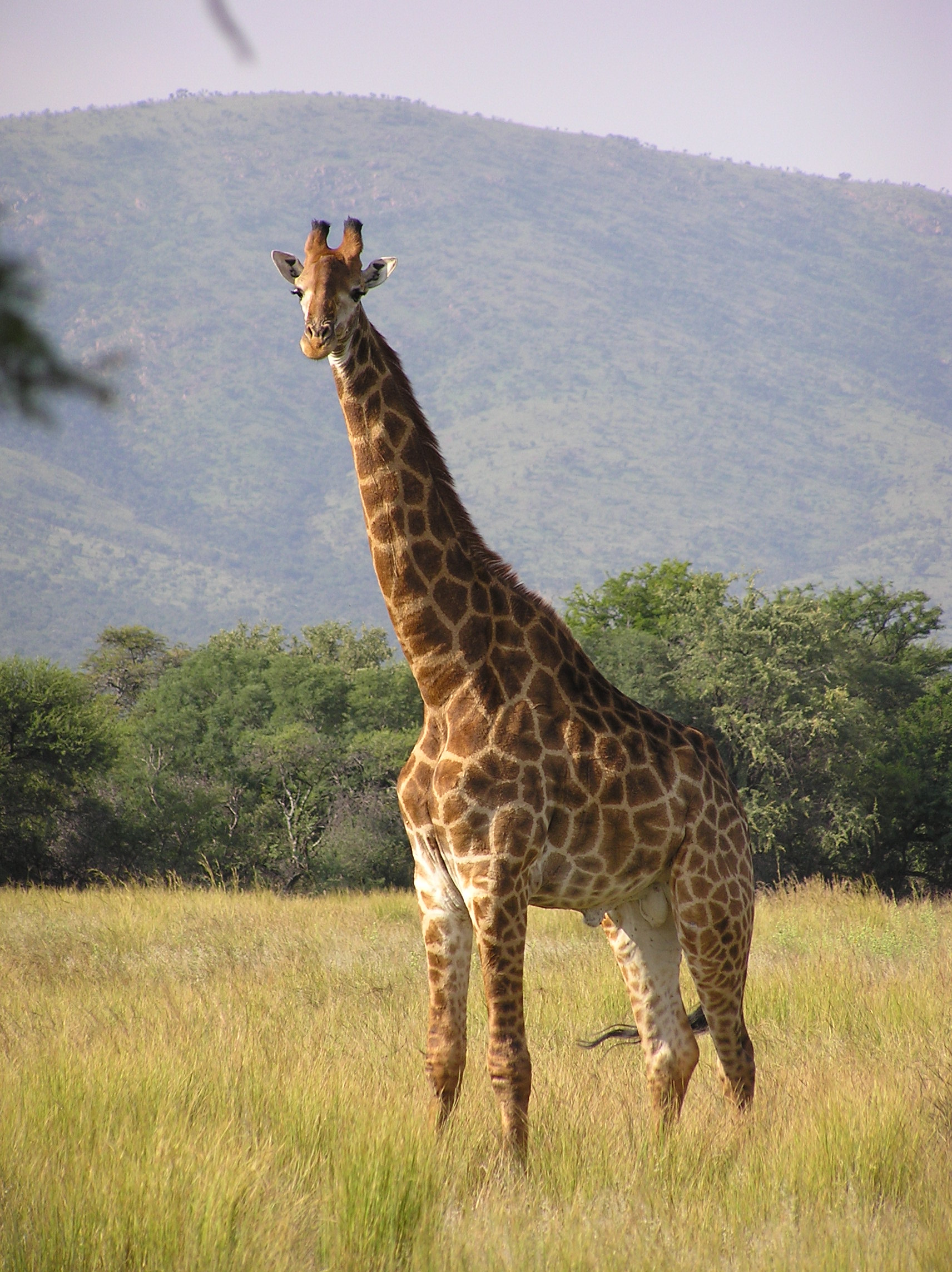
A giraffe in the Central Kalahari Game Reserve

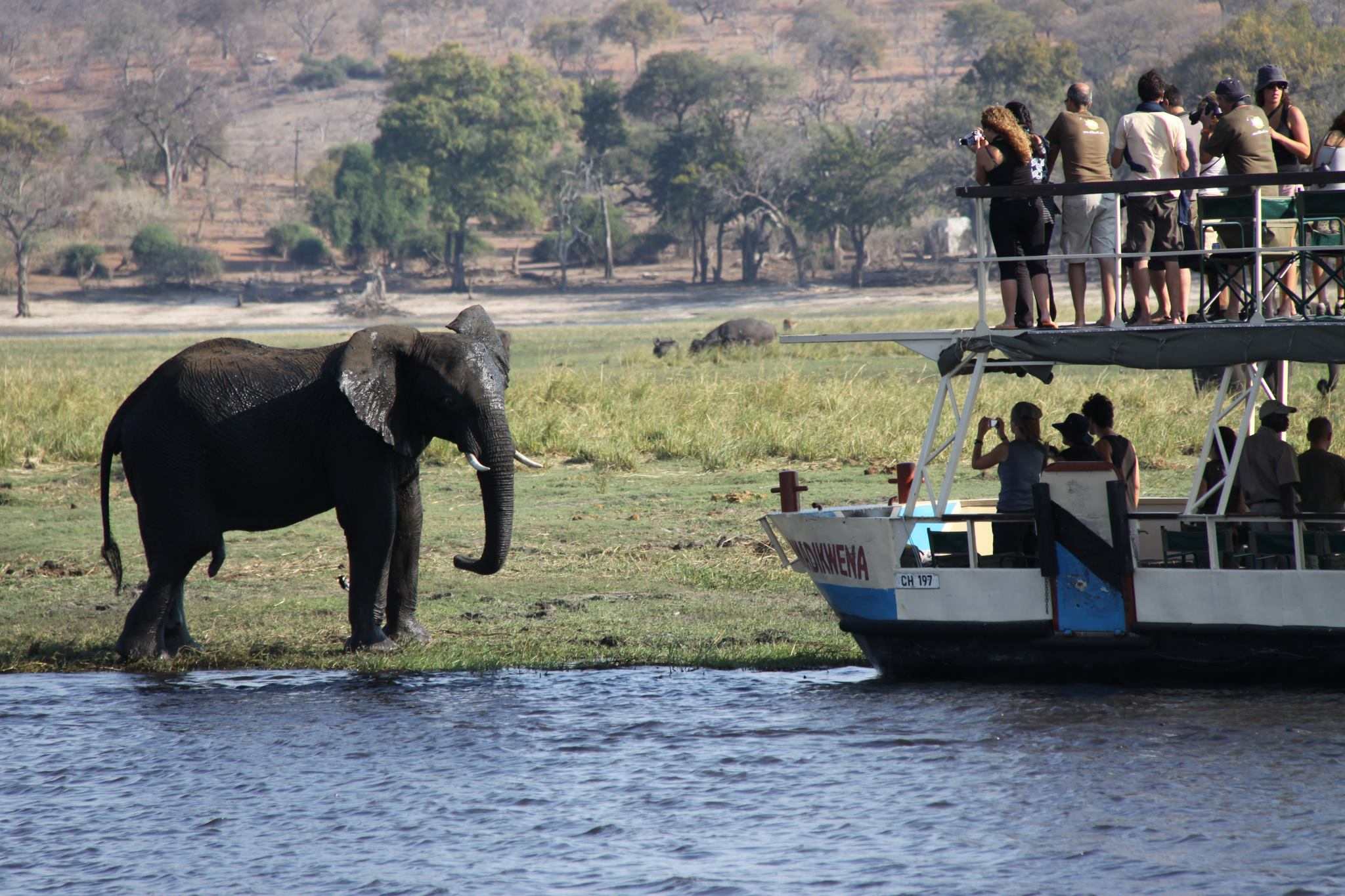
Tourists at Sedudu Island

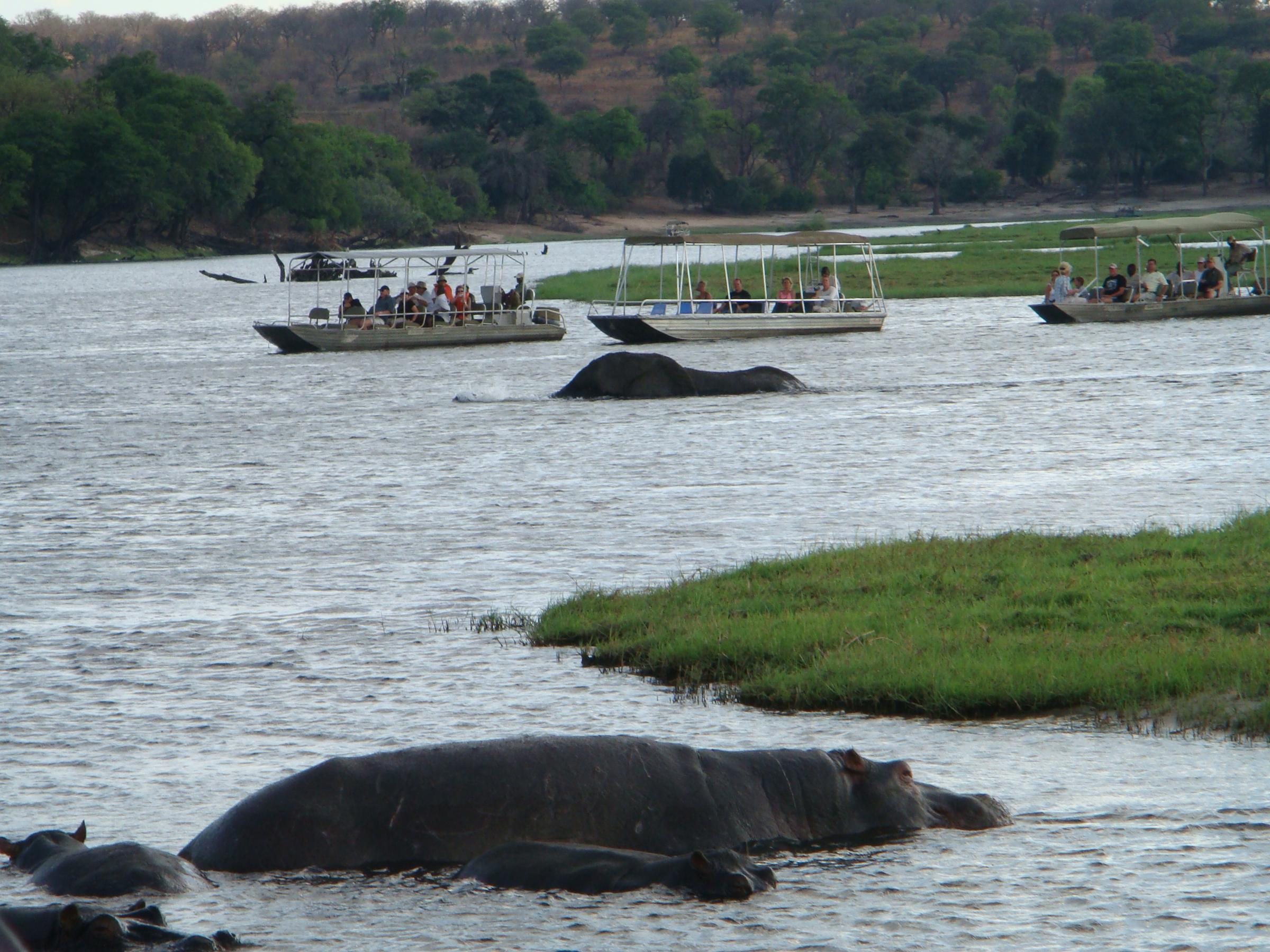
Hippos and elephants in Chobe

Botswana's principal tourist attractions are its game reserves, with hunting and photographic safaris available. Other attractions include the Okavango Delta region, which during the rainy season is a maze of waterways, islands, and lakes. The tourism industry also helped to diversify Botswana's economy from traditional sources such as diamonds and beef and created 23,000 jobs in 2005.

== Development of the tourist industry ==
Botswana's tourism industry began to develop in the context of favorable geopolitical conditions in the 1990s. Southern Africa experienced political stability following the end of apartheid as well as the release of Nelson Mandela from prison in 1990. The global improvements in transportation and communication systems of the time further served to make tourism in Botswana more viable. In 1990 Botswana implemented a Tourism Policy aiming to increase tourist numbers, government revenue, and employment opportunities. The policy focused on attracting up-market international tourists from Europe, North America, Australia, and New Zealand to increase revenue. While employment rates were successfully increased with the tourism industry representing 4.5% of the total formal employment in Botswana, most higher paying management level positions in the industry were reserved for expatriate workers.

The Rediscover Botswana tourism campaign took place in 2020 to increase domestic tourism.

== Social and environmental impacts ==
Botswana relies on natural resources for both general livelihoods and tourism. The scarce and fragile natural resources of the country are particularly crucial for rural livelihoods, which utilize water, forests, and rangeland. The Okavango Delta region is both a popular tourist destination and a world heritage site as well as one of the largest inland deltas in the world. Its popularity with tourists has stimulated the growth of infrastructure, facilities, and services in the region including banks, hotels, and airstrips. However, local communities of Khwai, Mababe and Sankoyo villages in the Okavango complain they lack access to natural resources of the Moremi Game Reserve because it has been dominated by international tourists and foreign tourism companies. Botswanan tourism facilities have been described as enclave tourism, self-contained facilities which does not yield a lot of economic activity in the surrounding areas.

While the vast majority of attractions are based on the country's natural resources, the tourism industry itself makes the very resources it has commodified vulnerable to damage. Large groups of people in tourist groups can disrupt wildlife and lead them to migrate to other habitats that may be unsustainable. Litter left behind by tourist groups can also alter soil composition and introduce harmful invasive species to the region. Other popular tourist activities like speedboating can further disturb aquatic wildlife while wildlife and bird photography can distort the behavior of certain species including their feeding and breeding patterns.

Botswana has experimented with various methods of preserving natural resources including community based natural resource management (CBNRM), which is based on assumption that local people have more incentive and are more committed to the sustainable use of natural resources where they live compared to the more removed government. However, the lack of resources and skills in local communities has often led them to depend on the assistance of international partners to achieve their dual goals of increasing economic prosperity and preserving natural resources.

Expanding cultural tourism in Botswana has the potential to make tourism more sustainable by reducing the pressure and traffic in existing wildlife attraction sites while simultaneously creating a more equitable distribution of tourism-based development by providing more opportunities for local communities to engage in the tourism economy. Cultural tourism provides opportunities for tourists to learn about art, heritage, and local traditions. Some argue it can boost the economic status of the people, create employment, enhance community cohesion and cultural pride, and contribute to the development of infrastructure. Similarly, village based tourism also focuses on exposing tourists to traditional crafts and daily life, which particularly advantages women, who have often been left out of the benefits of tourism. Revenue from village based tourism creates opportunities for vocational training and entrepreneurship for local women. Employment in their own home village allows women to fulfill their familial obligations while gaining financial independence.

== Visitor attractions ==
=== Hotels, lodges and camping sites ===
Botswana offers the traveller a choice of accommodation options from top class tourist hotels, luxury lodges and safari camps, to budget guesthouses and camping grounds. The major tourist areas have a choice of private lodges, safari camps, and public camping sites.

A variety of cuisines are served in hotels and restaurants from local favourites and game meat, to continental and Asian dishes. There are also plenty of fast food outlets and small restaurants/takeaways offering local dishes. For the full collection of accommodation sources, you can browse at Tourism in Botswana - Africa Tourism Web Portal.

=== National parks ===
==== Central Kalahari Game Reserve ====
Central Kalahari Game Reserve is an extensive national park in the Kalahari Desert of Botswana. Established in 1961 it covers an area of 52,800 km^{2}, making it the second largest game reserve in the world. The park contains wildlife such as giraffe, brown hyena, warthog, cheetah, wild dog, leopard, lion, blue wildebeest, eland, gemsbok, kudu and red hartebeest.

==== Chobe National Park ====
Chobe National Park, in northwest Botswana, has one of the largest games concentration in Africa continent. By size, this is the third largest park of the country, after the Central Kalahari Game Reserve and the Gemsbok National Park, and is the most diverse. This is also the country's first national park.

==== Kgalagadi Transfrontier Park ====
Kgalagadi Transfrontier Park is a large wildlife preserve and conservation area in southern Africa. The park straddles the border between South Africa and Botswana and comprises two adjoining national parks: Kalahari Gemsbok National Park in South Africa and Gemsbok National Park in Botswana. The total area of the park is 38000 km^{2} (14,668 mi^{2}). Approximately three-quarters of the park lies in Botswana and one-quarter in South Africa.

== Tourist information ==
The Botswana government's National Conservation Strategy and Tourism Policy was created to promote tourism while protecting wildlife areas. Citizens of the United States, South Africa, British Commonwealth countries, and most Western European countries do not need visas for stays of less than 91 days. Passports are required for travel in the country. Proof of yellow fever and cholera immunizations are required of tourists from infected areas.

The World Economic Forum report on Travel and Tourism Global Competitiveness ranked Botswana 88 out of 141 countries in its 2015 Travel and Tourism Competitiveness Index. The same report praised Botswana's attractions, and the low rating was due to challenges confronting tourists, including lack of access to modern technologies, poor roads and communications.

== Statistics ==
In 1999, there were 2,100 hotel rooms with 3,720 beds and a 53% occupancy rate. 843,314 visitors arrived in Botswana that year with more than 720,000 from other African countries. Tourism revenues in the year 2000 totaled $313 million. In 2003, the US Department of State estimated the average daily cost of staying in Gaborone to be $129, compared to Kasane at $125. Costs may be as low as $50 in other regions of the country. Botswana is considered the safest country to visit in Africa.

Most visitors arriving to Botswana who stated holiday as their purpose of entry in 2014 came from the following countries of nationality:

| Rank | Country | Number |
|---|---|---|
| 1 | South Africa | 68,519 |
| 2 | United States | 38,522 |
| 3 | Germany | 26,151 |
| 4 | United Kingdom | 20,601 |
| 5 | Zimbabwe | 18,285 |
| 6 | Australia | 13,822 |
| 7 | Netherlands | 8,909 |
| 8 | Japan | 8,857 |
| 9 | France | 7,992 |
| 10 | Canada | 7,255 |
| | Total arrivals for holiday | 274,701 |

Most visitors arriving to Botswana were from the following countries of nationality:

| Country | 2016 | 2015 | 2014 | 2013 |
|---|---|---|---|---|
| Zimbabwe | 874,169 | 967,322 | 784,720 | 825,717 |
| South Africa | 759,564 | 808,118 | 600,387 | 742,639 |
| Zambia | 220,649 | 202,289 | 188,351 | 331,799 |
| Namibia | 187,044 | 170,326 | 162,453 | 169,733 |
| United States | 52,171 | 49,451 | 49,961 | 139,752 |
| United Kingdom | 42,534 | 41,011 | 39,675 | 47,929 |
| Germany | 35,288 | 32,230 | 34,576 | 43,674 |
| India | 19,297 | 17,413 | 18,342 | 13,543 |
| Lesotho | 18,773 | 18,842 | 12,408 | 10,839 |
| Malawi | 17,102 | 20,607 | 15,175 | 17,386 |
| Total | 2,401,786 | 2,501,616 | 2,082,521 | 2,598,158 |
