= Internet in Botswana =

The Internet in Botswana is used by approximately 87.2% of the population, as of 2023. There has been a massive increase in internet users since 2013 when only 30% of the population of Botswana was found to use the internet. This is notably higher than the percentage of internet users in Africa as a whole, which is around 43%. For reference, in 2023, the global statistic for internet users is 66%.

== Statistics ==
Internet users by region
Region	2005	2010	2017	2023
Africa	2%	10%	21.8%	37%
Americas	36%	49%	65.9%	87%
Arab States	8%	26%	43.7%	69%
Asia and Pacific	9%	23%	43.9%	66%
Commonwealth of Independent States	10%	34%	67.7%	89%
Europe	46%	67%	79.6%	91%

- Internet top-level domain: .bw
- Internet users:
  - 323,368 users, 15% of the population (2013).
  - 241,272 users, 148th in the world; 11.5% of the population, 166th in the world (2012);
  - 120,000 users, 154th in the world (2009);
  - 80,000 users (2007).

Broadband subscriptions by region
Subscription	Place	2007	2010	2014	2019
Fixed	Africa	0.1%	0.2%	0.4%	0.4%
Fixed	Americas	11%	14%	17%	22%
Fixed	Arab States	1%	2%	3%	8.1%
Fixed	Asia and Pacific	3%	6%	8%	14.4%
Fixed	Commonwealth of Independent States	2%	8%	14%	19.8%
Fixed	Europe	18%	24%	28%	31.9%
Mobile	Africa	0.2%	2%	19%	34%
Mobile	Americas	6%	23%	59%	104.4%
Mobile	Arab States	0.8%	5%	25%	67.3%
Mobile	Asia and Pacific	3%	7%	23%	89%
Mobile	Commonwealth of Independent States	0.2%	22%	49%	85.4%
Mobile	Europe	15%	29%	64%	97.4%

- Internet broadband:
  - 16,407 fixed broadband subscriptions, 134th in the world; 0.8% of the population, 143rd in the world;
  - 348,124 wireless broadband subscriptions, 102nd in the world; 16.6% of the population, 76th in the world.
  - The average internet subscription costs $60.72, 108th in the world.
- Internet hosts:
  - 1,806 hosts (2012);
  - 6,374 hosts (2008).
- Internet IPv4 addresses: 100,096 addresses allocated, less than 0.05% of the world total, 47.7 addresses per 1000 people (2012).
- Internet service providers:
  - 53 ISPs (2020);
  - 11 ISPs (2001);
  - 2 ISPs (1999).

== ADSL ==
Botswana Telecom rolled out ADSL in early 2006. Current residential ADSL offerings include speeds from 512 kbit/s to 4096 kbit/s with prices from 292 to 863 BWP (~32 to ~97 US$).

ADSL has been introduced in the following areas: Gaborone, Tlokweng, Mogoditshane, Molepolole, Phakalane, Francistown, Lobatse, Palapye, Maun, Kasane, Selibe-Phikwe, Letlhakane, Jwaneng, and Orapa.

== Internet censorship and surveillance ==
There are no known government restrictions on access to the Internet or credible reports that the government monitors e-mail or Internet chat rooms. The constitution and law provide for freedom of speech and press and the government generally respects these rights. The constitution and law prohibit arbitrary interference with privacy, family, home, correspondence, or browsing pornographic websites, and the government generally respects these prohibitions in practice.

== See also ==
- Botswana
- Botswana Internet Exchange
- Botswana Communications Regulatory Authority
- Media of Botswana
- Telecommunications in Botswana
