= Civil Aviation Authority of Botswana =

CAAB
Government parastatal overview
- Formed: 2008
- Jurisdiction: Botswana
- Headquarters: Gaborone, Botswana
- Government parastatal executives: Dr. Bao Mosinyi, Chief Executive Officer; Christopher Ferguson, Director Aviation Safety; Silas Silas, Director Air Navigation Services
- Parent department: Minister of Transport and Communications
- Website: www.caab.co.bw

Civil Aviation Authority of Botswana (CAAB) is the civil aviation authority of Botswana. Its head office is in the Fairscape Precinct, Plot 70667 Unit Building 1, 3rd Floor, Fairgrounds Gaborone. The Civil Aviation Authority Act, 2004 (CAA Act, 2004) established the agency, which in 2009 became fully operational. The previous agency was the Department of Civil Aviation (DCA), subordinate under the Ministry of Works and Transport. The Civil Aviation Authority of Botswana (CAAB) is responsible for the regulation and development of air transport, providing air navigation services, managing airports and advising the government on all aspects of civil aviation.

It is Statutory Corporation established by the Civil Aviation Authority Act of 2004 and commenced full operations as an autonomous regulator on 1 April 2009. The continued existence of CAAB was provided for by the Civil Aviation Act, 2011 which repealed the previous Act establishing the Authority. Before its establishment, most of its functions were performed by the former Department of Civil Aviation Aviation (DCA). The CAA Act 2004 stipulates that the Authority shall perform its functions in accordance with sound commercial and financial principles, and shall ensure as far as possible, that its revenue is sufficient to meet the expenditure properly chargeable to its revenues.
