= .bw =

Top-level Internet domain for Botswana

- Introduced: 19 March 1993
- TLD type: Country code top-level domain
- Status: Active
- Registry: Botswana Communication Regulatory Authority
- Sponsor: Botswana Communication Regulatory Authority
- Intended use: Entities connected with Botswana
- Actual use: Very popular in Botswana
- Structure: Registrations are at the third level beneath various second-level names.
- DNSSEC: Yes
- Registry website: nic.net.bw

.bw is the Internet country code top-level domain (ccTLD) for Botswana. It is officially administered by the Botswana Communication Regulatory Authority since 2013, previously being administered by the University of Botswana.

== Operations ==
Most current registrations are at the third level beneath second-level names such as co.bw and org.bw, but some second-level registrations also exist, such as Botswana Telecommunications Corporation's website. However, registrations at the second level have been stopped, and all entities who are currently registered under this level will be given a three-year grace period to migrate to any other level.

The most visited .bw domain is google.co.bw by Google Inc. in Botswana.

Botswana Communication Regulatory Authority operates a WHOIS service for .bw domains and was previously operated by Botswana Telecommunications Corporation.

== Second-level domains ==
=== Active ===
- .ac.bw – for academic institutions.
- .agric.bw – for farmers and agricultural businesses.
- .co.bw – for commercial entities and businesses.
- .gov.bw – for government and related entities.
- .co.bw – for commercial entities.
- .me.bw – for individuals and personal brands.
- .net.bw – for network service providers.
- .org.bw – for non profit organizations.
- .shop.bw – for e-commerce websites.

== See also ==
- ISO 3166-2:BW
