= Botswana Communications Regulatory Authority =

Government agency

Botswana Communication Regulatory Authority
Agency overview
- Formed: 1 April 2013
- Preceding agency: Botswana Telecommunications Authority
- Jurisdiction: Botswana
- Headquarters: Plot 50671 Independence Avenue, Gaborone
- Agency executives: Martin Mokgware, Chief Executive; Tshoganetso Kepaletswe, Chief Technology Officer; Thapelo M. Mogopa, Director Strategy and Projects
- Parent department: Ministry of Transport and Communications (Botswana)
- Parent agency: Government of Botswana
- Website: www.bocra.org.bw

The Botswana Communication Regulatory Authority (BOCRA) is a government agency founded under the Communications Regulatory Authority Act, 2012 (CRA Act) on 1 April 2013. BOCRA is responsible for regulating all matters related to telecommunications (wire, cellular, satellite, cable), and postal services of Botswana.

== History ==
BOCRA was established in 2013 to replace Botswana Telecommunications Authority by the Government of Botswana Parliament when the Telecommunications Act of 1996 was amended and revised to create the Communications Regulatory Authority.

== Country code top level domain ==
During the formation of BOCRA, it was given the authority to administer and manage the .bw country TLD.

== See also ==
- List of telecommunications regulatory bodies
- List of Operators in Botswana
- Commonwealth Telecommunications Organisation
