= List of rivers of Botswana =

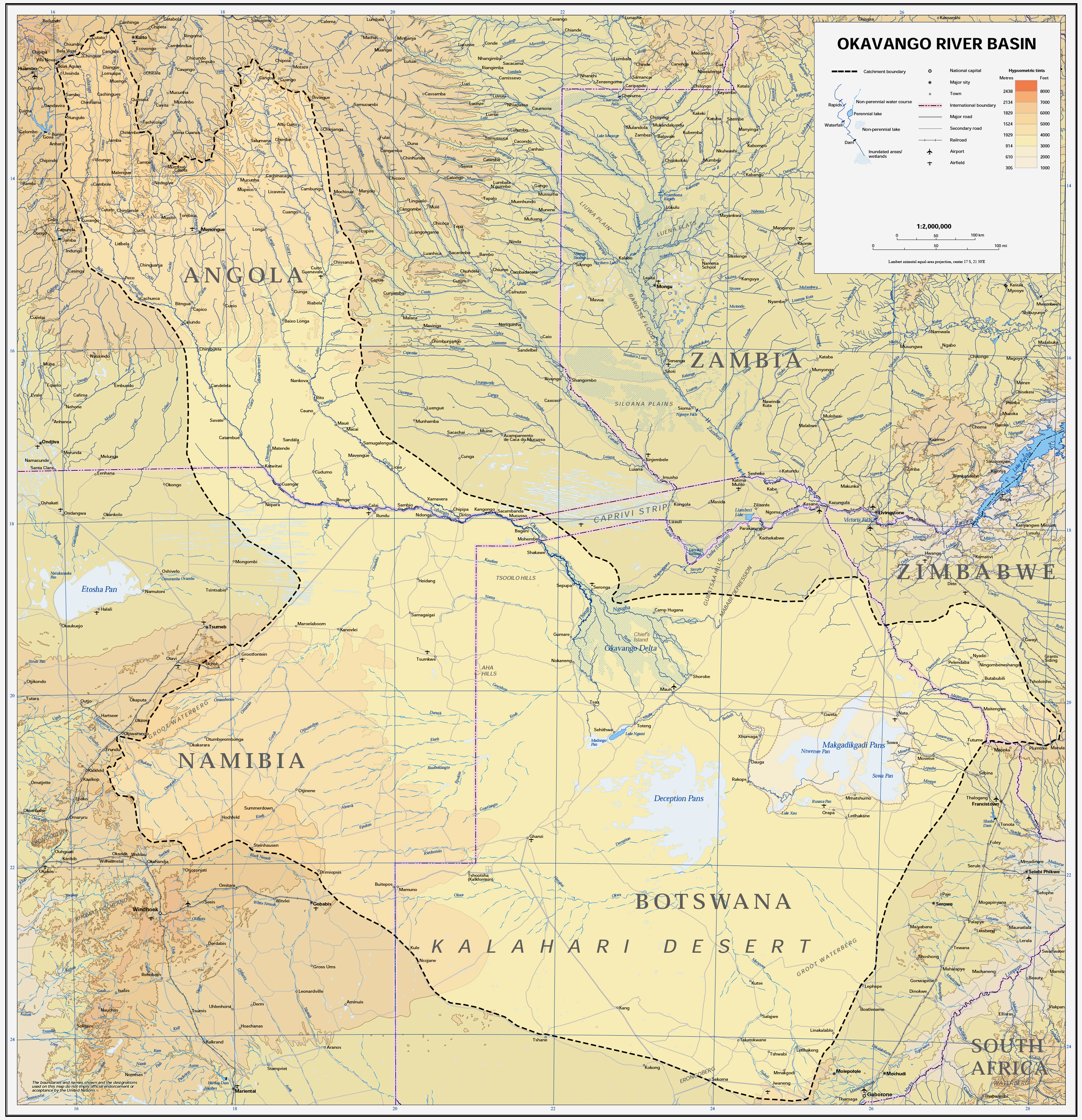
Map of het Okavango-stroomgebied showing the main rivers and tributaries in Botswana.

This is a list of rivers in Botswana. This list is arranged by drainage basin, with respective tributaries indented under each larger stream's name.

== Atlantic Ocean ==
  - Molopo River
    - Nossob River
    - Moselebe River

== Indian Ocean ==
- Zambezi River
  - Cuando River (Chobe River) (Linyanti River)
    - Makwegana River (Selinda Spillway) (receives outflow from the Okavango during floods)
- Limpopo River
  - Shashe River
    - Ramokgwebana River
    - Tati River
  - Motloutse River
  - Lotsane River
  - Serorome River
  - Notwane River
    - Metsimotlhabe River
  - Marico River

== Okavango Delta ==
- Okavango River
  - Ngamaseri River
- Khwai River
- Eiseb River
- Khaudum River

== Makgadikgadi Pan ==
- Boteti River (flows out of the Okavango Delta in rainy seasons)
  - Thamalakane River
- Nata River
  - Tutume River
- Semowane River
- Mosetse River
- Lepashe River
- Mosope River

== Kalahari Desert ==
- Okwa River
