= Kalahari Salt Pans =

The Kalahari Salt Pans is the largest network of salt pans in the world. It includes the Makgadikgadi Pan, the Nxai Pan, the Sua Pan, and the Ntwetwe Pan.

== Sources ==
- Raper, P.E.: Streekname in Suid-Afrika en Suidwes (Naamkundereeks, nr. 1). Kaapstad: Tafelberg vir die Suid-Afrikaanse Naamkundesentrum van die Raad vir Geesteswetenskaplike Navorsing, Instituut vir Taal, Lettere en Kuns, 1972. ISBN 0-624-00182-2
