= Lake Makgadikgadi =

Former lake (paleolake) in Botswana

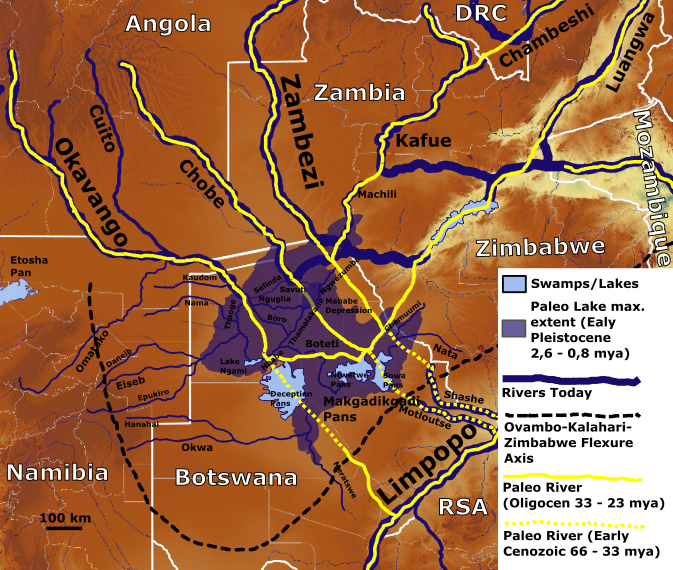
- The extent of the former Lake Makgadikgadi.

- Location within Botswana Location within Africa
- Location: Kalahari Desert in Botswana
- Coordinates: 20°43′0″S 24°57′3″E
- Basin countries: Botswana
- Average depth: 30 metres (98 ft)

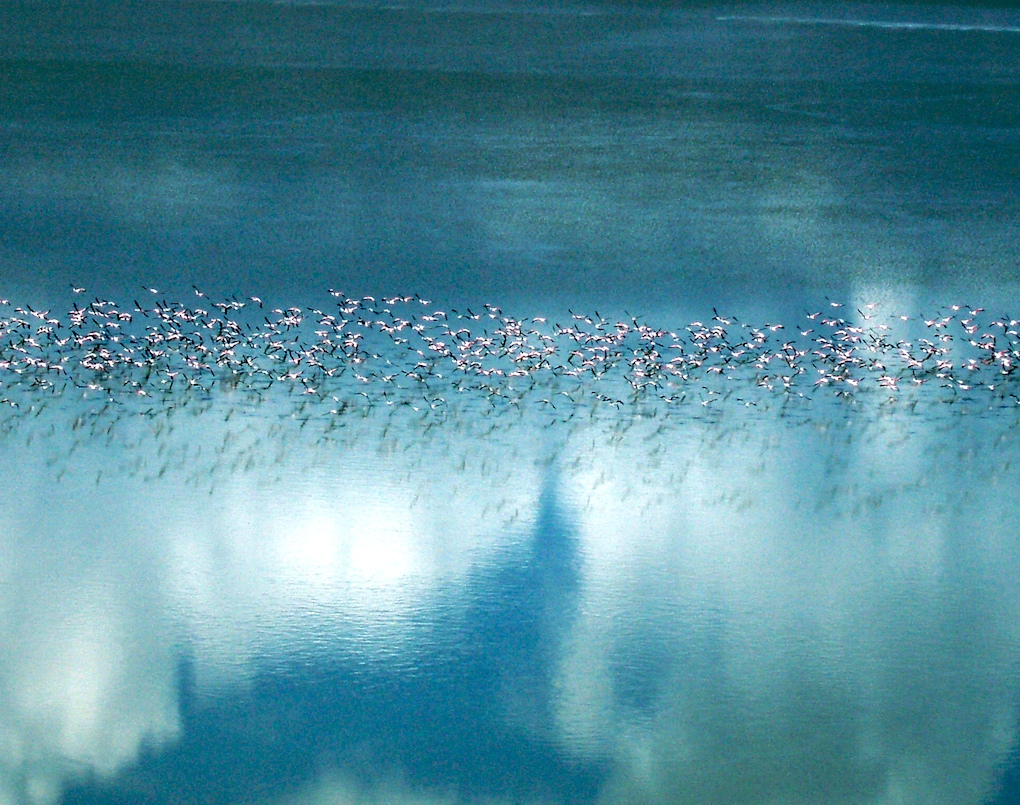
The Makgadikgadi Salt Pans in Botswana mark the remnants of the lake today. They are one of the most important breeding sites in Southern Africa for lesser and greater flamingos

Lake Makgadikgadi (Setswana: Letsha la Makgadikgadi, [lɪt͜sʰa la makχʰadiˈkχʰaːdi]) was a paleolake that existed in what is now the Kalahari Desert in Botswana from 2,000,000 years BP to 10,000 years BP. It may have once covered an from 80,000 to 275,000 km^{2} (31,000 to 106,000 sq mi) and was 30 metres (98 ft) deep. The Okavango, Upper Zambezi, and Cuando rivers once all emptied into the lake. Its remains are seen in the Makgadikgadi salt pans, one of the largest salt pans in the world.

Mitochondrial DNA research suggests (though this remains a matter of controversy) that the lake region is the homeland of Homo sapiens, where humans first evolved as a distinct species about 200,000 years ago, before expanding to other parts of Africa about 70,000 years later.

== Origin and history ==
Approximately 3 million years ago, strong easterly winds formed long dunes, which ran from east to west across the middle of the Kalahari Desert. During wetter times, these dunes channeled the great rivers of the area, the Okavango, Chobe, and Upper Zambezi, southeastward to join with the Limpopo River and into the Indian Ocean.

Northern Botswana has a series of deep, underlying fault lines running beneath the sand. These faults are thought to be the southernmost extensions of the same system of parallel fault lines that are pulling away from each other and formed the East Africa's Great Rift Valley. Parts of the courses of both the Linyanti River and Chobe River mark the line of these faults today.

Approximately 2 million years ago, the fault known as the Ovamboland-Kalahari-Zimbabwe axis (which runs from NE to SW from Harare through Bulawayo and ends in the east side of the Kalahari Desert) moved in an epeirogenic flexure, and cut off the drainage route into the Limpopo. The blocked outflow allowed the creation of Lake Makgadikgadi.

The great Magwikwe Sand Ridge between Savuti and North Gate probably defined one of its northwestern shorelines. Another is thought to have been the less obvious Gidikwe Sand Ridge lying just to the west of the western border of the present Makgadikgadi National Park.

Wave-washed features can be found on several of the Kalahari's higher places in this region. The eastern side of the Ghoha Hills, north of Savuti, is a particularly clear example of this. Round, water-eroded pebbles can also be found.

As the millennia passed, the lake filled to capacity. It began to overflow about 20,000 years ago, taking the lowest point in the watershed in the north east as its new outlet. This caused the middle and lower Zambezi Rivers to connect, forming Victoria Falls. With the water now able to flow out of the basin, Lake Makgadikgadi drained partially and its average level decreased.

A drier climatic period followed, which increased evaporation and decreased the flow of the rivers that fed the lake. By about 10,000 years ago the drying of Lake Makgadikgadi was in an advanced stage. Sediment and debris from the Okavango River and windblown sand were gradually filling the lake.

The Gumare fault formed and lowered the land. As a result, the water of the Okavango River spread out over a much larger area of land than it previously had, forming the now characteristic fan-shaped inland delta of the Okavango, which further reduced the water that flowed into Lake Makgadikgadi and hastened its demise.

=== Human origin theory ===
In October 2019, a team led by Vanessa Hayes proposed that land around Lake Makgadikgadi was the area where modern humans (Homo sapiens) first evolved. The findings are based on 1,217 samples of mitochondrial DNA, taken from populations in Southern Africa. The researchers were able to trace where the earliest maternal lineage of modern Homo sapiens emerged, about 200,000 years ago (200 kya). They concluded this was in an area south of the Zambezi River, encompassing parts of what is now known as Botswana, Namibia, and Zimbabwe. This corresponds to the shores of the ancient Lake Makgadikgadi.

The conclusion is disputed by Chris Stringer, head of human origins at the Natural History Museum in London, and Sarah Tishkoff, a geneticist at the University of Pennsylvania.Excavations of early Homo sapiens activities have been found at Ga-Mohana Hill in Northern Cape dated to 105,000 years ago (105 kya).

== Ecology ==
Lake Makgadikgadi is theorised to have been the birthplace of the vast number of cichlids that once swam the Congo, Zambezi, Okavango and Limpopo rivers—as many as 100 to 400 new species, of which approximately 25 survive today. The lake's sheer size may have provided the ancestors of these fish with an extremely wide range of new ecological niches to exploit and thus could have served as the stimulus for the evolution of the new species, which they may have done in record time before the lake drained completely. The theory further says that the new species, after having evolved within the confines of the lake, could have escaped with the lakewater as it drained, and populated the rivers of the region to evolve into the cichlids that exist today.

Currently this land is desiccated for most of the year and is a seasonal wetland in the rainy summer months.

== Legacy ==
Today the only remains of Lake Makgadikgadi are the Okavango Delta, the Nxai Pan, Lake Ngami, Lake Xau, the Mababe Depression, and the two main Makgadikgadi pans: the Sua Pan and the Nwetwe Pan.

The Makgadikgadi Salt Pans are among the largest in the world and are formed from the last remnants of this great lake. The Okavango Delta is a very large, swampy inland delta formed where the Okavango River reaches the former bed of the lake. It is now an endorheic basin in which all the water reaching the basin is ultimately evaporated and transpired.

The other south draining rivers that once fed the lake have now all been captured by the Zambezi.
