= Okavango =

Okavango may refer to:

== Geographical features ==
- Okavango River, a river in southwest Africa, which drains into the Okavango Delta
- Okavango Delta, a delta in Botswana
- Okavango Basin, an endorheic basin that includes the Okavango River and Okavango Delta.
- Okavango, an electoral constituency for the National Assembly of Botswana from 1965 to 2024.

== Administrative units ==
- Kavango Region, a region of Namibia, named Okavango until 1998

== Others ==
- Geely Okavango, a mid-size sport utility vehicle

== See also ==
- Kavango (disambiguation)
