= Boteti River =

Natural watercourse in Botswana

Coordinates: 21.2711°S 24.7949°E

Boteti River Botletle, Botletli
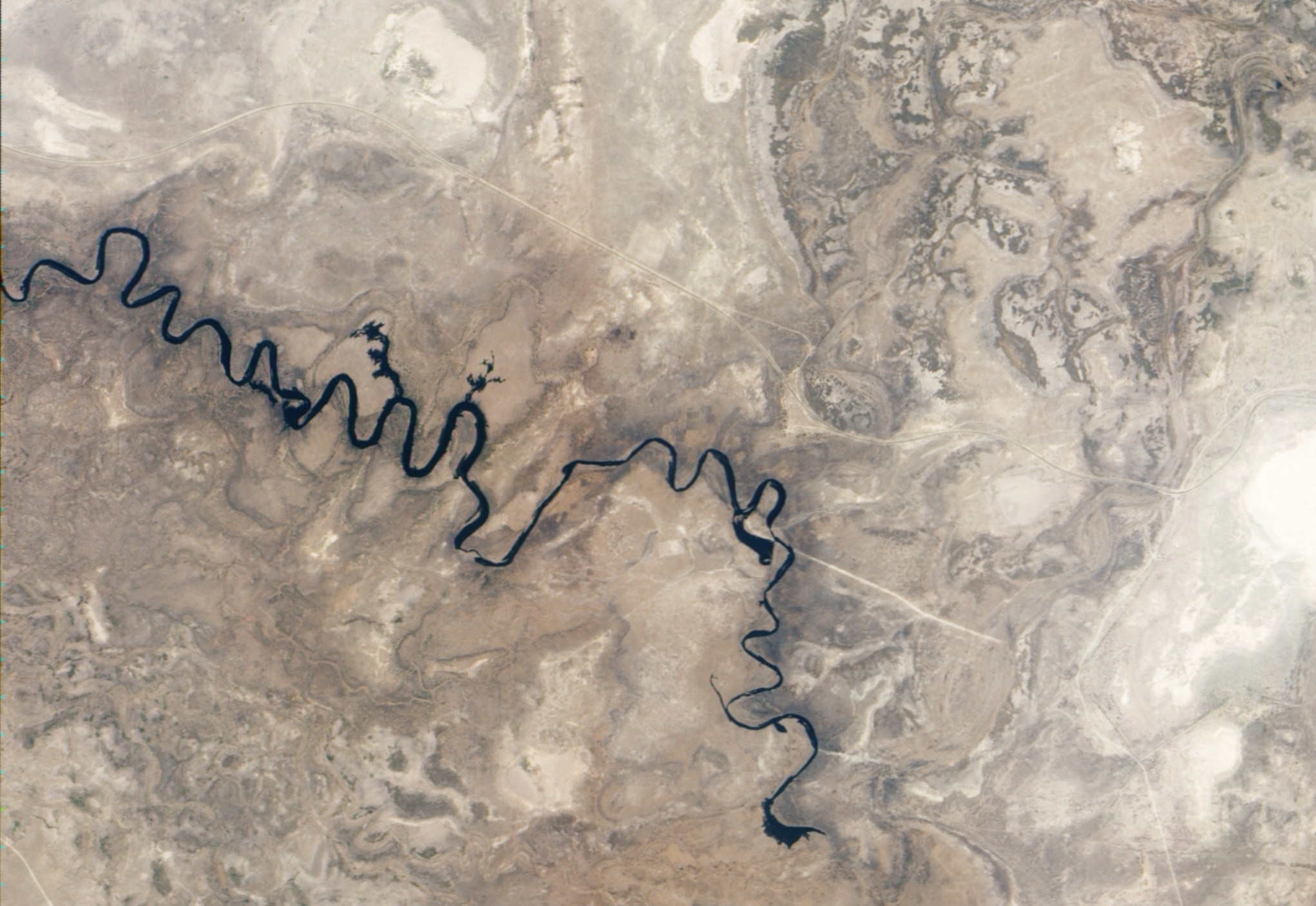
- The Boteti River

Location
- Country: Botswana
- Region: Okavango Delta

Physical characteristics
- Mouth: Sua Pan
  - location: Botswana
- Length: 1,700 km (1,100 mi)

The Boteti River (also spelt as Botletle or Botletli) is a natural watercourse in Botswana of 1700 km in length. It derives flow from the core Okavango Delta through the Thamalakane River in Maun.

== Hydrology ==
In the rainy season, the Boteti discharges to the Makgadikgadi Pans, bringing that area alive with seasonal activity and high biological productivity. In the dry season, the Boteti is particularly important to wildlife which congregate in that area, since most seasonal ponds are then devoid of water.

The Boteti flows southeastward out of the Thamalakane River swamp at Toteng, then flows northeastward past Tlkaseoulo, over Ghautsa Falls, and then flows east past the villages of Makalamabedi, Muekekle, and Matima, and then at Kwaraga, it turns south past the villages of Phukumakaku, Khumaga (Lekono), Sukwane, Rakops (Jakops), and Xhuma (Khomo). It then flows past Lake Xau (or in a very wet year into and out of Lake Xau) and then heads east past the village of Mopipi (Madista) and into the Ntwetwe Pan.

The Boteti stretches from Ngamiland to the main Boteti District, where it is used to fill the Mopipi Dam, which is important to the diamond mines in the area, particularly the Orapa diamond mine. The diversion of the river has left many residents without an adequate source of fresh water; moreover, they could no longer enjoy fishing and other activities in the river.

== History ==
In the early and mid-20th century, the lower Boteti, below Sukwane, was a major grain-producing area, with over 2,000 ha under cultivation until 1980. However, the number and extent of wet years has declined, and the river was channelised below Rakops to increase flow to the Mopipi Dam. It flowed year-round before the mid-1990s, after which decreasing flows led to seasonal desiccation in some lower reaches.

== See also ==
- Nxai Pan
- Nata River
- Sua Pan
- Nwetwe Pan
