= Thamalakane =

Thamalakane may refer to:

- Thamalakane River, the river created by the Thamalakane fault line
- Thamalakane fault line, a fault line south of the Okavango Delta in Botswana, Africa
