= Thamalakane River =

Coordinates: 20°08′S 23°23′E

The Thamalakane River
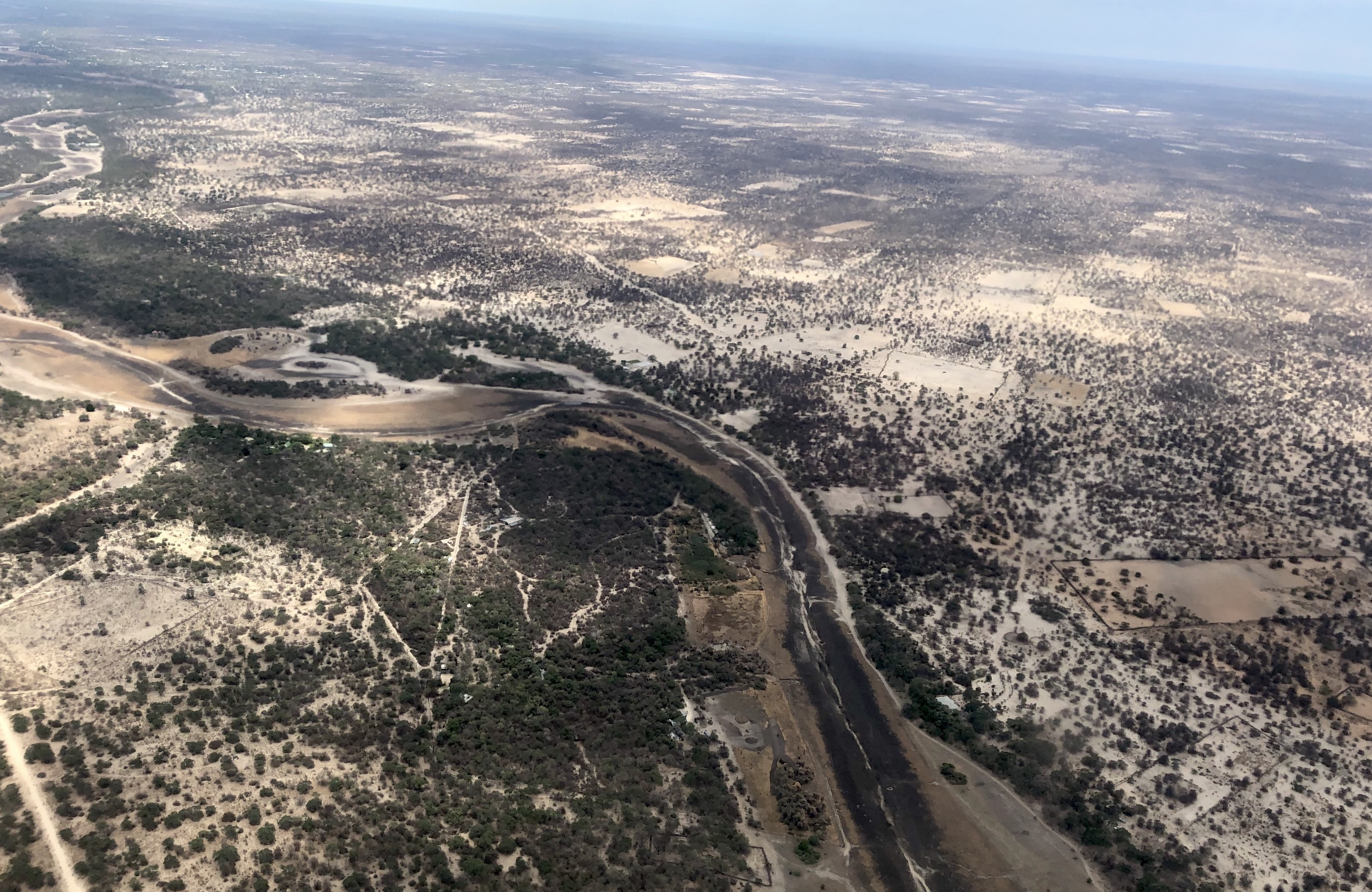
- Thamalakane River near Maun

Location
- Country: Botswana
- Region: Okavango Delta

Physical characteristics
- Mouth: Sua Pan
  - location: Botswana
- Length: 88 km (55 mi)

The Thamalakane River is a river located in Botswana, Africa, at the southern end of the Okavango Delta. It has no well defined beginning (spring) and no clear end (delta). It is the result of the Thamalakane fault - which began to form about two million years ago by the geological process of rifting that is currently splitting Africa apart along the East African Rift.

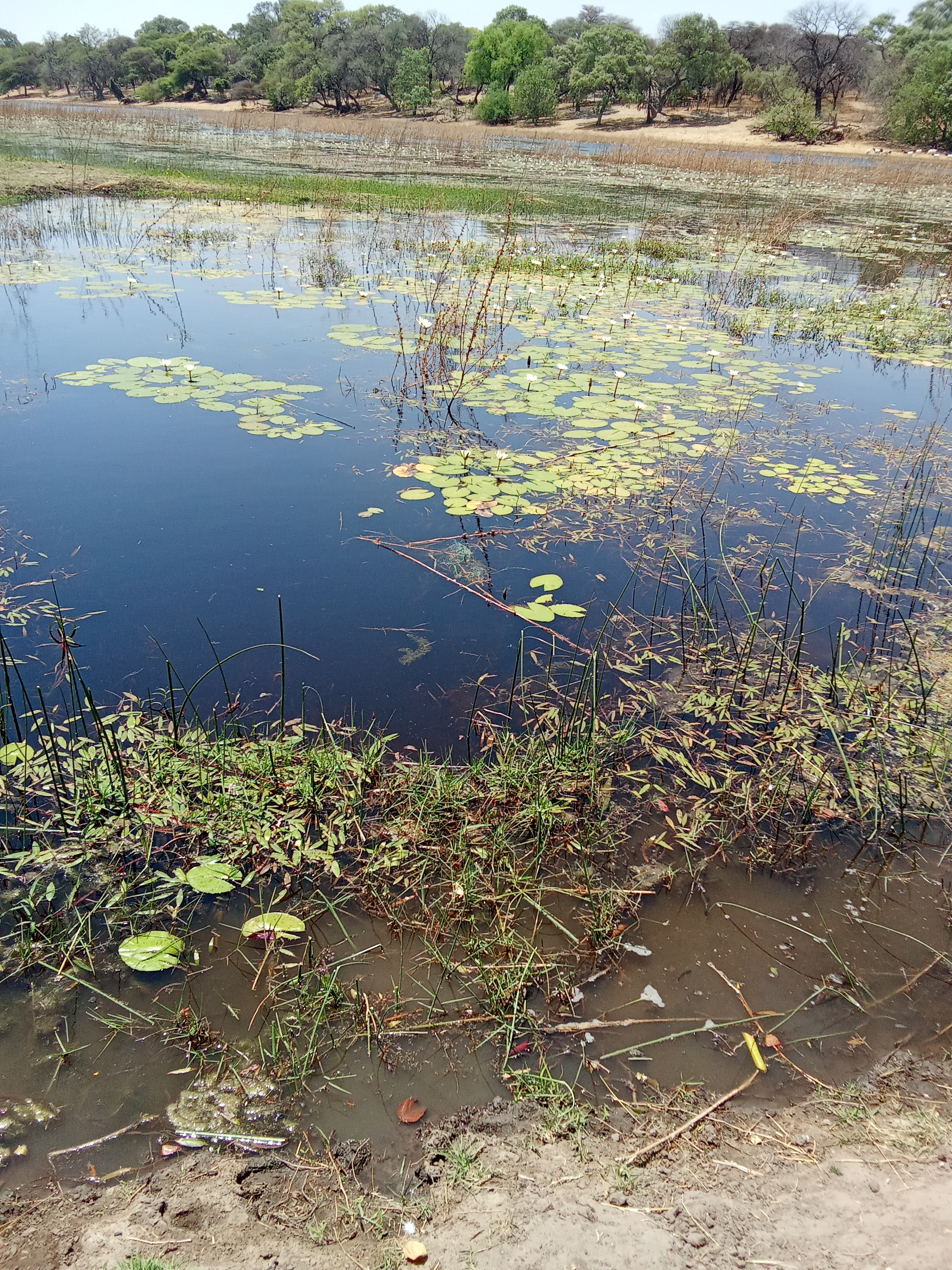
Water lilies in Thamalakane river

When the land between two parallel faults (the Gumare fault and the Kunyere fault) started dropping, the Okavango River's flow was blocked by the Thamalakane fault and it started to fan out and built myriads of water channels - what is now known as the Okavango Delta.

One of the main channels draining the Okavango Delta is the Boro River. Being blocked by the fault, it empties literally at a right angle into the waterway created by the fault, the Thamalakane River. Roughly 40 km to the west, the water found a break in the Thamalakane Fault. Again at a right angle it empties the Thamalakane River and forms the Boteti River, which incurs seasonal desiccation in some lower reaches. In the rainy season the Boteti discharges to the Makgadikgadi Pans, bringing that area alive with wet season high biological productivity.

In older days, the Boro fed not only the Thamalakane River but also smaller channels like the Boronyana and Shashe.

Along the Thamalakane River the village of Maun developed. Water supply to Maun is from well fields along the Thamalakane and Shashe Rivers.

== See also ==
- Boteti River
- Botswana Wildlife Training Institute
