= Kavango =

Kavango may refer to:

Geographical features

- Okavango River, a river in southwest Africa, which drains into the Okavango Delta
- Okavango Delta, a delta in Botswana
- Okavango Basin, an endorheic basin that includes the Okavango River and Okavango Delta.

Administrative units

- Kavango Region, a region of Namibia until 2013, when it was split into Kavango East and Kavango West
- Kavango East, one of 14 regions of Namibia
- Kavango West, one of 14 regions of Namibia

People and languages

- Kavango people, an ethnic group inhabiting the Kavango region
- Kavango languages, a group of languages that partially overlaps with the Kavango people
