= Mababe Depression =

Seasonal wetland in northern Botswana

- Location of Mababe Depression in Botswana
- Interactive map of Mababe Depression
- Location: Botswana
- Coordinates: 18°45′S 24°15′E
- Type: Seasonal wetland
- Basin countries: Botswana
- Surface area: 2,600 ha (6,400 acres) (seasonal extent)

The Mababe Depression is a large seasonal wetland in northern Botswana, situated between the Okavango Delta to the west and Chobe National Park to the north-east. It forms part of the same ancient lake basin as the Lake Makgadikgadi system. The depression is a key ecological zone, functioning as a seasonal grazing ground and wildlife corridor linking major conservation areas.

== Geography and hydrology ==
The depression lies south of the Savuti Channel and north of the Khwai River, within a low-lying basin of Pleistocene origin. It is located at approximately 18°45′S 24°15′E, in northern Botswana. The Mababe Depression forms part of a larger ecological system linking the Okavango Delta to the west with Chobe National Park to the north-east.

Seasonal rains flood the basin, creating shallow wetlands across an area of approximately 2,600 hectares, although the extent varies annually. During the dry season, residual pools and sub-surface moisture sustain grasslands.

In 2007, renewed flow in the Savuti Channel and associated waterways increased the duration of seasonal flooding and the availability of dry-season water sources. This has enhanced the depression’s role as a wildlife refuge.

== Ecology ==
Habitats include open grassland, mopane woodland and seasonal marsh. The area supports large concentrations of herbivores such as African buffalo, elephant, Burchell’s zebra and tsessebe. High herbivore density attracts predators including lion, spotted hyena, leopard, cheetah and African wild dog. Over 100 bird species have been recorded, including waterfowl, waders and raptors.

Seasonal movements of elephants, buffalo and other large herbivores link the depression to the riverfront habitats of Chobe National Park, the floodplains of the Okavango Delta, and the grasslands surrounding Lake Makgadikgadi, making it an important component of regional migration routes.

== Human history ==
Archaeological evidence suggests prehistoric use by San hunter-gatherers. The modern village of Mababe lies to the east, with a small population engaged in subsistence activities and wildlife-related employment.

== Conservation ==
The area falls within wildlife management areas NG41 and NG43, administered as a combination of community-managed and leased concessions. This framework limits permanent development and regulates tourism to maintain ecological integrity.

== Tourism ==
Tourism in the depression is low-density and high-value, with several operators running small camps and mobile safaris. These include Wilderness Mokete, Machaba Safaris, and a range of mobile expedition operators. Activities typically focus on game drives, birdwatching and photographic safaris during both wet and dry seasons.
