= Mosetse River =

River in Botswana

Coordinates: 20.6553°S 26.1197°E

Location
- Country: Botswana

Physical characteristics
- Source: Makgadikgadi Pans
- Mouth: Sua Pan
  - location: Botswana
- Length: 170 km (110 mi)

The Mosetse River is a natural watercourse in Botswana. Within the country of Botswana the Mosetse is a source of water to the ephemeral wetlands of the Makgadikgadi Pans, where a number of crustacean species of limited distribution thrive. More specifically the Mosetse River discharges into the Sua Pan, draining parts of eastern Botswana.

== See also ==
- Mosetse village
- Nwetwe Pan
- Sua Pan
