= Semowane River =

Coordinates: 20.3954°S 26.2557°E

Location
- Country: Botswana

Physical characteristics
- Source: Makgadikgadi Pans
- Mouth: Makgadikgadi

The Semowane River is a major natural watercourse in Southern Africa. Within Botswana the Semowane River forms a boundary between several governmental jurisdictions. This river is a vital source of water to the ephemeral wetlands of the Makgadikgadi, where a number of species of limited distribution thrive. Specifically the Semowane River discharges to the Sua Pan.

== See also ==
- Nwetwe Pan
