= Botswana Wildlife Training Institute =

The Botswana Wildlife Training Institute (est. 1984) is a government funded educational facility in Botswana. It is located adjacent to the Maun Wildlife Educational Park, on the Thamalakane River near Maun in the North-West District.

It operates under the Botswana Department of Wildlife & National Parks (DWNP), and the Botswana Ministry of Environment, Wildlife & Tourism.

== Programs ==
It has programs for: wildlife management and wildlife conservation, professional tour guide certification, and Japanese language training.

- Certificate in Wildlife Management — 1 year program.
- Diploma in Wildlife Management — 2 year program.
- Professional Guides programme — 19 weeks.
- Japanese language course — 10 weeks.

=== Short courses ===
Short continuing education courses include:

- Customer Service (2 weeks)
- Fire Management (1 week)
- First Aid (2 weeks)
- Radio Communication (2 weeks)
- Problem Animal Control (6 weeks)
- Induction and Basic Training (11 weeks)
- Leadership Skills Enhancement Course (8 weeks)
- Professional Guide Course (6 weeks)

The training institute celebrated its 25th anniversary in 2009 with a graduation ceremony for 70 students.
