= Mosope River =

River in Botswana

Coordinates: 21°07′S 26°16′E

Location
- Country: Botswana

Physical characteristics
- Source
  - location: Near Moshupa
- Mouth: Limpopo River

Basin features
- Progression: Mosope → Kolobeng → Metsimotlhaba → Notwane → Limpopo
- River system: Limpopo River basin

The Mosope River is a natural watercourse in Botswana, passing through the village of Moshupawhich is home to the Bakgatla-ba-ga-Mmanaana community. The Mosope River joins the Kolobeng River to form Metsimotlhaba which joins Notwane River around Mochudi, and continues to the Limpopo River.The river supports seasonal vegetation and water resources for nearby settlements, though its flow varies greatly with rainfall patterns.

== See also ==
- Sua Pan
