= Lake Xau =

Lake in Botswana

- Location within Botswana Location within Africa
- Location: Botswana
- Coordinates: 21°18′S 24°46′E
- Primary inflows: Boteti River and the Okavango Delta

Lake Xau is a lake that is sometimes a dry lakebed in Botswana. It is fed by the Boteti River and the Okavango Delta. The lake has been described as "when it holds water, ... one of the most important wetlands for waterfowl in Southern Africa".
