= Nata River =

Nata River Manzamnyama River

Location
- Country: Botswana and Zimbabwe

Physical characteristics
- Source: Sandown
  - location: Zimbabwe
  - coordinates: 20°25′30″S 28°10′50″E
- Mouth: Makgadikgadi Pans (Sua Pan)
  - location: Botswana
- Length: 330 km (210 mi)

The Nata River or Manzamnyama River is a natural watercourse in Southern Africa. It is an ephemeral river flowing in Zimbabwe and Botswana. It has a length of 330 kilometres (210 mi) from its source to mouth, 210 kilometres (130 mi) in Zimbabwe and 120 kilometres (75 mi) in Botswana. Its total catchment area is 24,585 square kilometres (9,492 sq mi). The river originates in Sandown (S20.425036˚, E28.180660˚), a small farming town located on the Zimbabwean central watershed 50 kilometres (31 mi) south west of Bulawayo and ends in the Makgadikgadi Pans (S20.348816˚, E26.240166˚) in Botswana. There is no outlet from the salt pans which can be considered as the “dead sea” of the south. The upper reaches of the river are located in a commercial farming area where good environmental and farming practices have resulted in the river experiencing very little siltation/sedimentation. Impressive sedimentation starts occurring about 65 kilometres (40 mi) along the river course marking the beginning of a 90-kilometre (56 mi) stretch in Zimbabwe where the river passes through communal farming areas. It is on this stretch where the sand-abstraction potential of the river is realised and communities rely on the sand river water for domestic, farming and livestock purposes. Within the country of Botswana the Nata River is a source of water to the ephemeral wetlands of the Makgadikgadi Pans, where a number of species of limited distribution thrive. Specifically the Nata River discharges to Sua Pan, draining parts of eastern Botswana and southwestern Zimbabwe.

== See also ==
- Nwetwe Pan
- Sua Pan
