= Makgadikgadi Pan =

Dry lakebed in Botswana

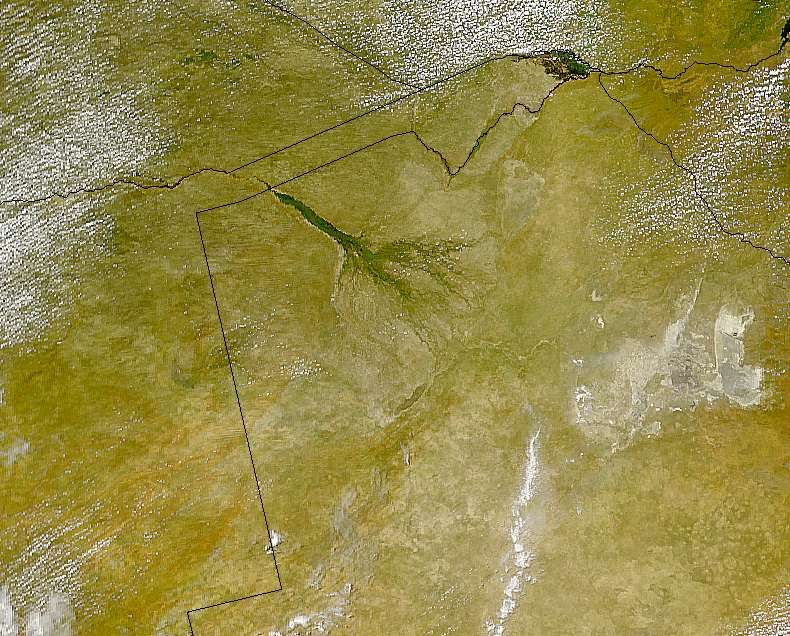
- The Makgadikgadi pans are clearly visible to the right of the dark-green broom-shaped Okavango Delta in this satellite image of Botswana

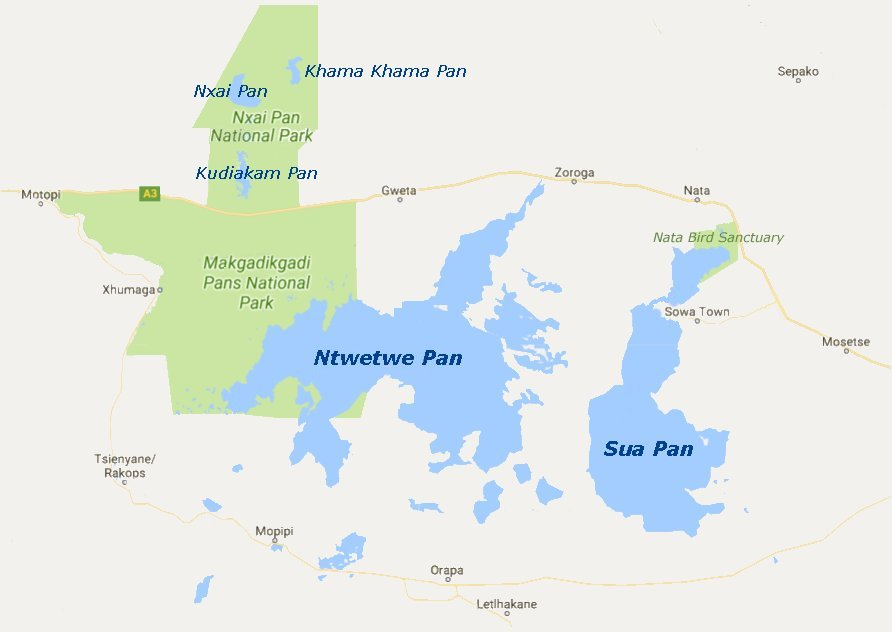
- The main water source is the Nata River, called Amanzanyama in Zimbabwe, where it rises at Sandown about 37 mi (59.5 km) from Bulawayo. A smaller amount of water is supplied by the Boteti River from the Okavango delta.

Geography
- Location: Okavango Delta
- Country: Botswana
- Coordinates: 20°48′S 25°20′E

The Makgadikgadi Pan /məˈkædiˈkædi/ (Tswana pronunciation [makχʰadiˈkχʰaːdi]) is a salt pan situated in the middle of the dry savanna of north-eastern Botswana, is one of the largest salt flats in the world. The pan is all that remains of the formerly enormous Lake Makgadikgadi, which once covered an area larger than Switzerland, but dried up tens of thousands of years ago. Recent studies of human mitochondrial DNA suggest that modern Homo sapiens first began to evolve in this region some 200,000 years ago, when it was a vast, exceptionally fertile area of lakes, rivers, marshes, woodlands and grasslands especially favorable for habitation by evolving hominins and other mammals.

== Location and description ==
Lying southeast of the Okavango Delta and surrounded by the Kalahari Desert, Makgadikgadi is technically not a single pan, but many pans with sandy desert in between, the largest being the Sua (Sowa), Ntwetwe and Nxai Pans. The largest individual pan is about 4,900 km^{2} (1,900 sq mi). A dry, salty, clay crust most of the year, the pans are seasonally covered with water and grass, and are then a refuge for birds and animals in this very arid part of the world. The climate is hot and dry, but with regular annual rains.

The main water source is the 330-kilometre-long (210 mi) Nata River, called Amanzanyama in Zimbabwe, where it rises at Sandown about 60 km (37 mi) from Bulawayo. A smaller amount of water is supplied by the Boteti River from the Okavango Delta.

These salt pans cover 16,000 km^{2} (6,200 sq mi) in the Kalahari Basin and form the bed of the ancient Lake Makgadikgadi, which evaporated many millennia ago. Archaeological recovery in the Makgadikgadi Pan has revealed the presence of prehistoric humans through abundant finds of stone tools; some of these tools have been dated sufficiently early to establish their origin as earlier than the era of Homo sapiens. Pastoralists herded grazing livestock here when water was more plentiful earlier in the Holocene.

The lowest place in the basin is Sua Pan with an elevation of 890 m (2,920 ft).

Panoramic view of the salt pan

== Geology ==
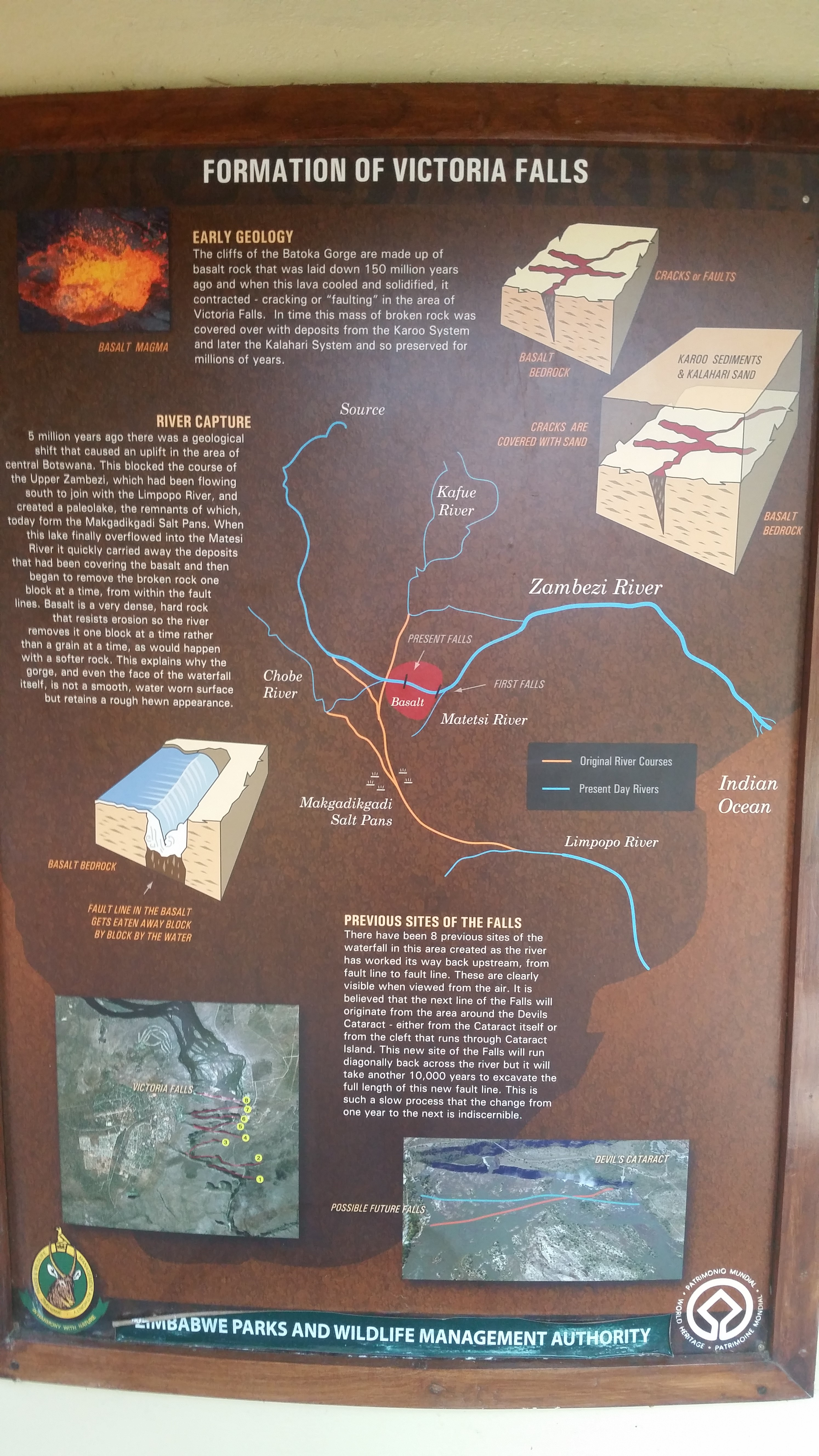
Victoria Falls share geology with Makgadikgadi and Kalahari

As the ancestral Lake Makgadikgadi shrank, it left relic shorelines, which are most evident in the southwestern part of the basin. As the lake shrank numerous smaller lakes formed with progressively smaller shorelines. The relic shorelines at elevations of 940 m (3,100 ft) and 920 m (3,018 ft) can be seen mostly easily on Gidikwe Ridge, west of the Boteti River.

The geologic processes behind the formation of the basin are not well understood. It is conjectured that there was a gentle down-warping of the crust, with accompanying mild tectonics and associated faulting; however, no significant plate boundary faults have been identified. The main axis of the developing graben runs northeast–southwest.

Kubu Island and Kukome Island are igneous rock "islands" in the salt flat of Sua pan. Kubu Island lies in the southwestern quadrant of Sua Pan, contains a number of baobab trees, and is protected as a national monument.

== Flora ==
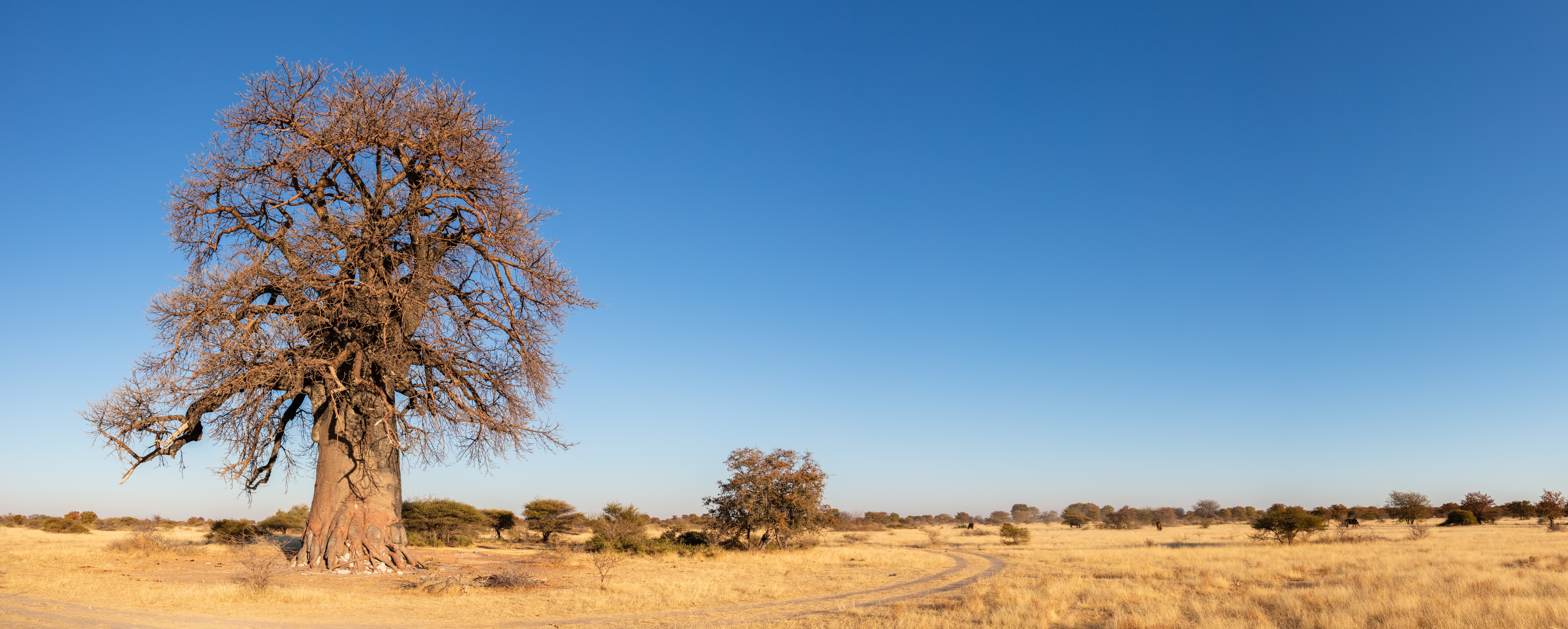
Baobab (Adansonia) in the Makgadikgadi Pan's National Park

The pans themselves are a salty desert whose only plant life is a thin layer of blue-green algae. However the fringes of the pan are salt marshes and further out these are circled by grassland and then shrubby savanna. The prominent baobab trees found in the area function as local landmarks. One of them, named after James Chapman, served as an unofficial post office for 19th-century explorers.

== Fauna ==
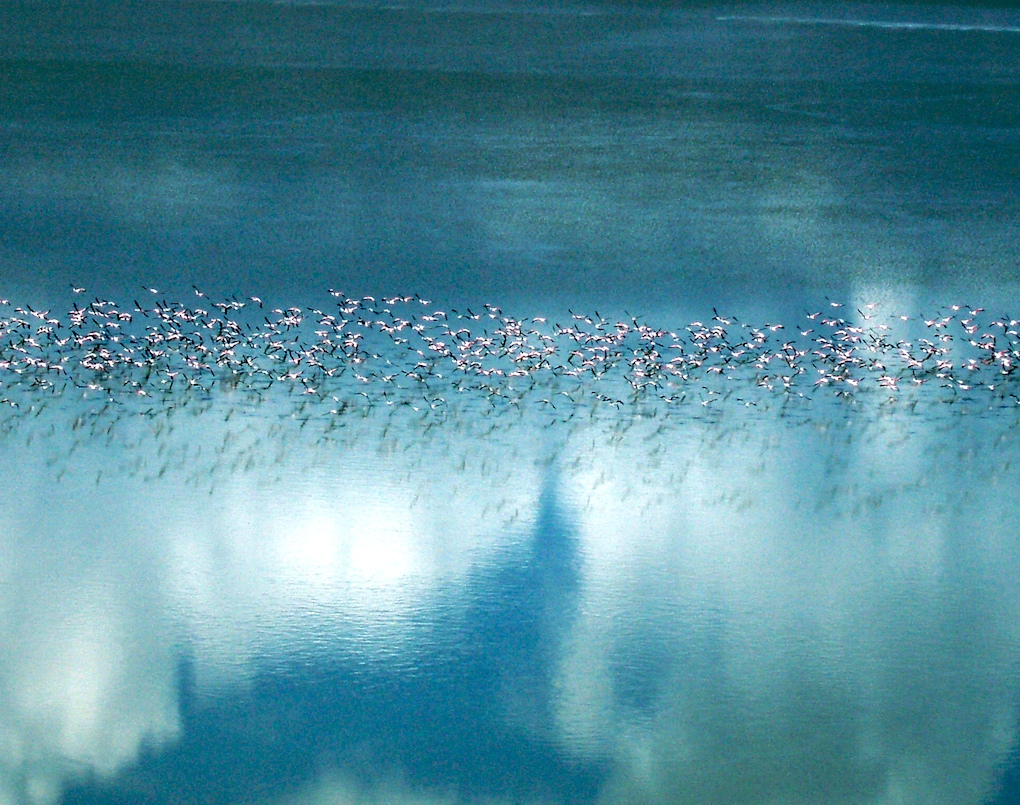
Flamingo migration at the Makgadikgadi Pan

Very little wildlife can exist here during the harsh dry season of strong hot winds and only salt water, but following rain, the pan becomes an important habitat for migrating animals including wildebeest and one of Africa's biggest zebra populations, and the large predators that prey on them. The wet season also brings migratory birds such as ducks, geese and great white pelicans. The pan is home to one of only two breeding populations of greater flamingos in southern Africa, and only on the Soa pan, which is part of the Makgadikgadi pans. The other breeding population is at Etosha, in the Northern part of Namibia. The only birds here in the dry season are ostriches, chestnut-banded plover (Charadrius pallidus) and Kittlitz's plover (Charadrius pecuarius). The grasslands on the fringes of the pan are home to reptiles such as tortoises, rock monitor (Varanus albigularis), snakes and lizards including the endemic Makgadikgadi spiny agama (Agama hispida makgadikgadiensis). The region's salt water is home to the cladoceran crustacean Moina belli.

== Threats and preservation ==
The salt pans are inhospitable and human intervention has been minimal, so they remain fairly undisturbed, although land surrounding the pans is used for grazing and some areas have been fenced off, preventing the migration of wildlife. Modern commercial operations to extract salt and soda ash began on Sua Pan in 1991, and there are also plans to divert water from the Nata River for irrigation, which would cause severe damage to the salt pan ecosystem. Another threat is the use of quad bikes and off-road vehicles by tourists, which disturbs breeding colonies of flamingos. Illegal hunting in the national parks is a persistent problem.

There are some protected areas within the Makgadikgadi and Nxai Pan National Park. The Makgadikgadi Pans Game Reserve has large migrations of zebra and wildebeest from the Boteti River across to Ntwetwe Pan, while the Nata Sanctuary in Sua Pan is a place to see birdlife and antelopes. In Nxai Pan the baobabs painted by 19th century British artist Thomas Baines are still visible. The area can be accessed between the towns of Nata and Maun, or from the town of Gweta.

== Gallery ==
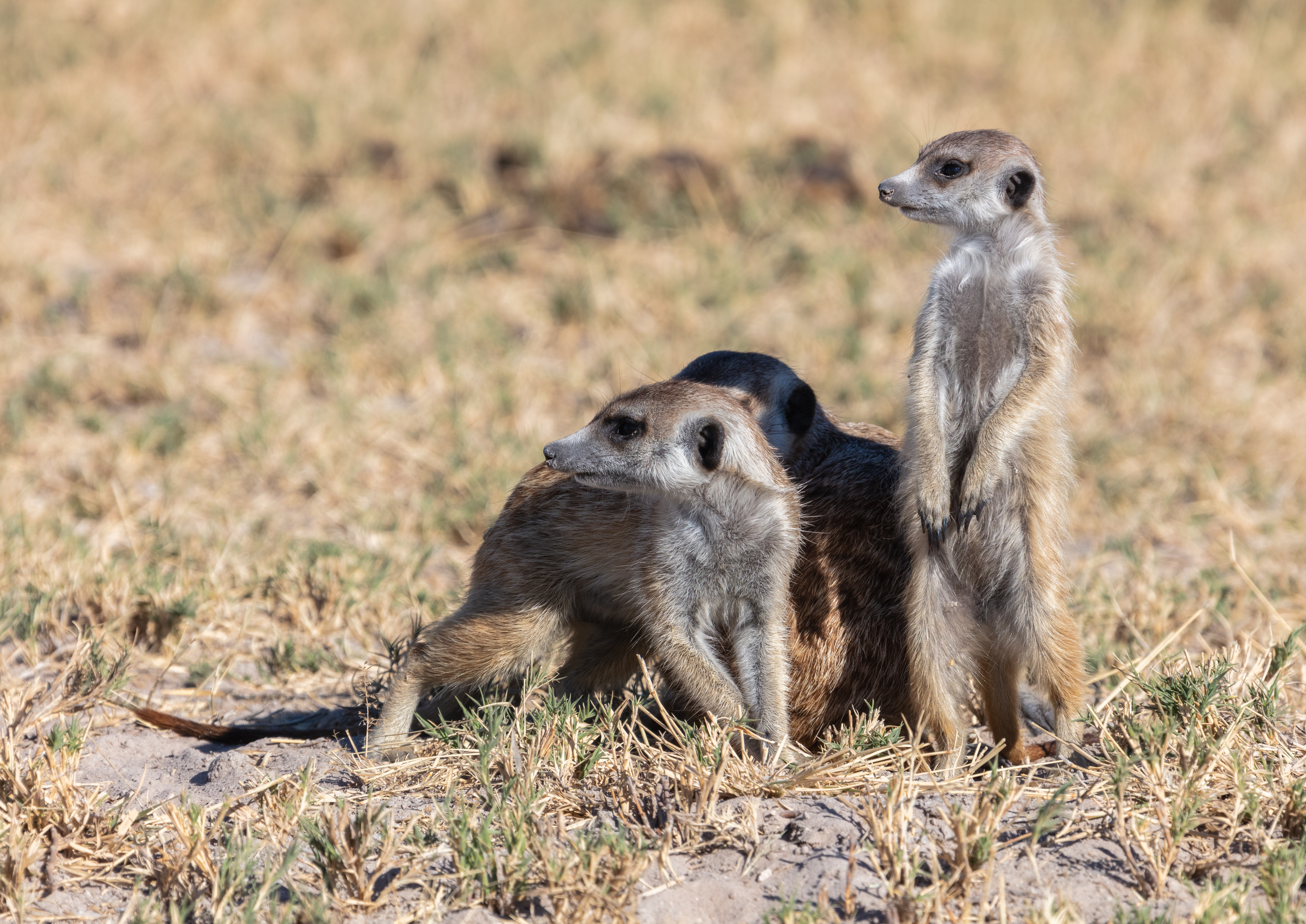
Colony of meerkats (Suricata suricatta)

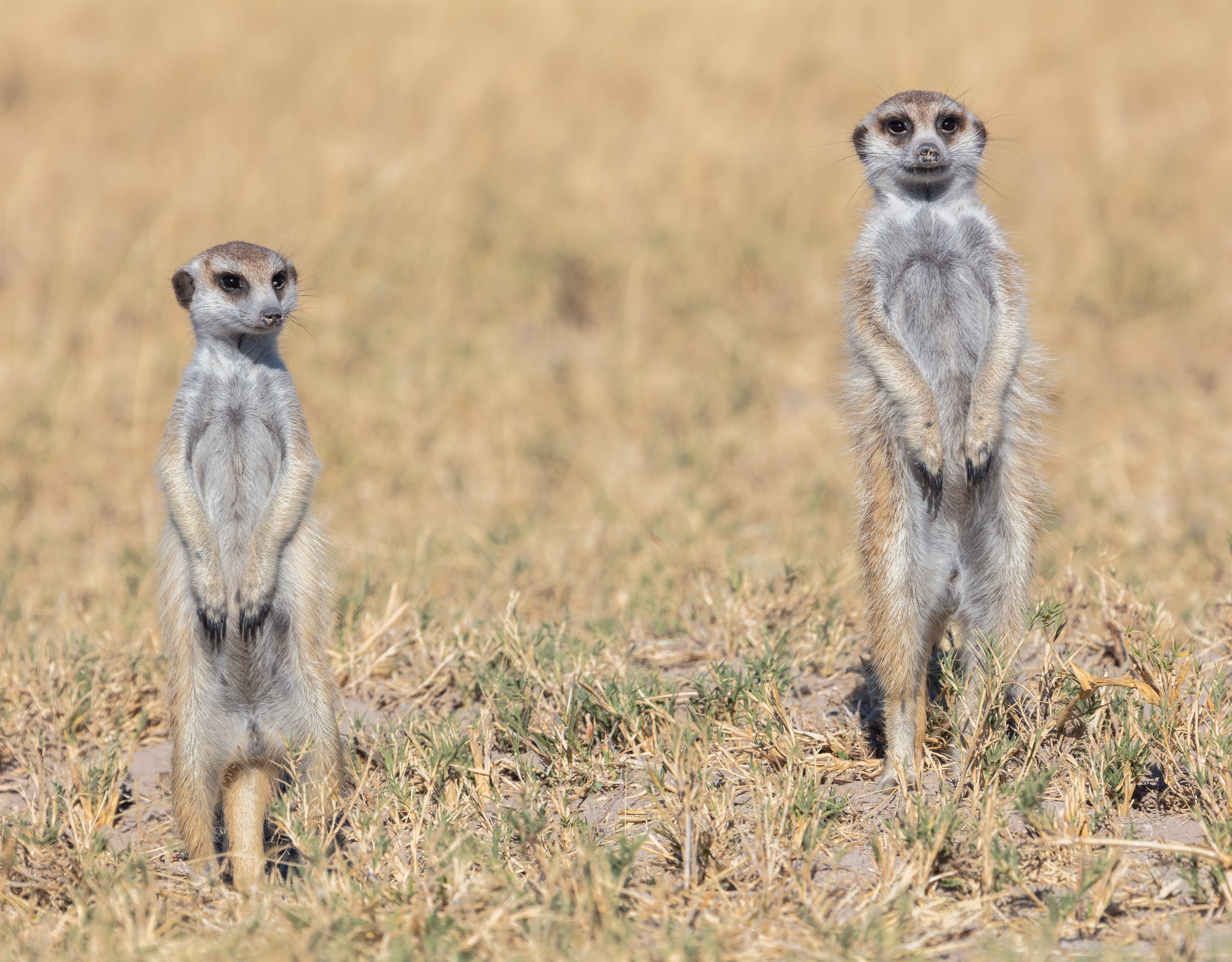
Meerkats

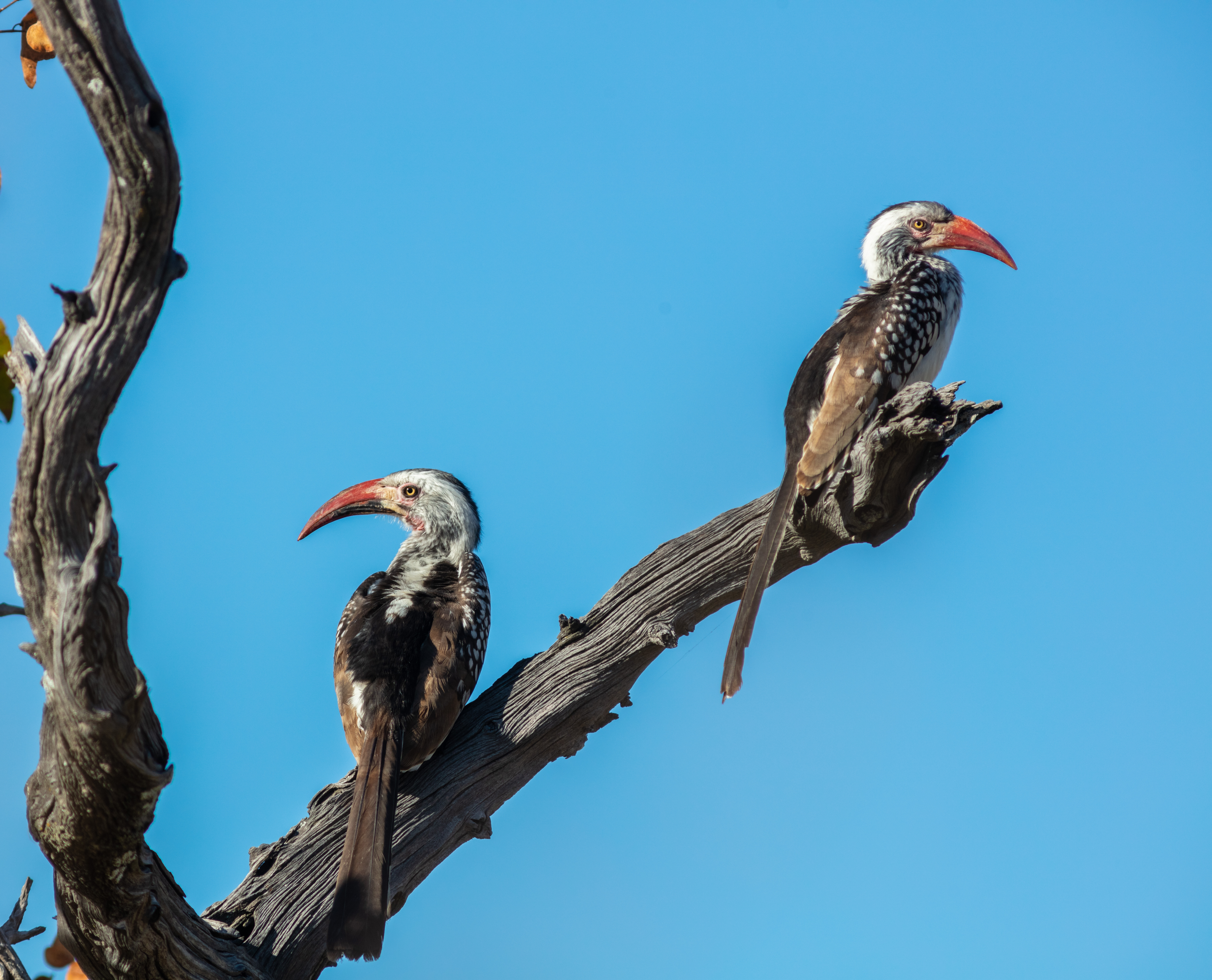
Southern red-billed hornbills (Tockus rufirostris)

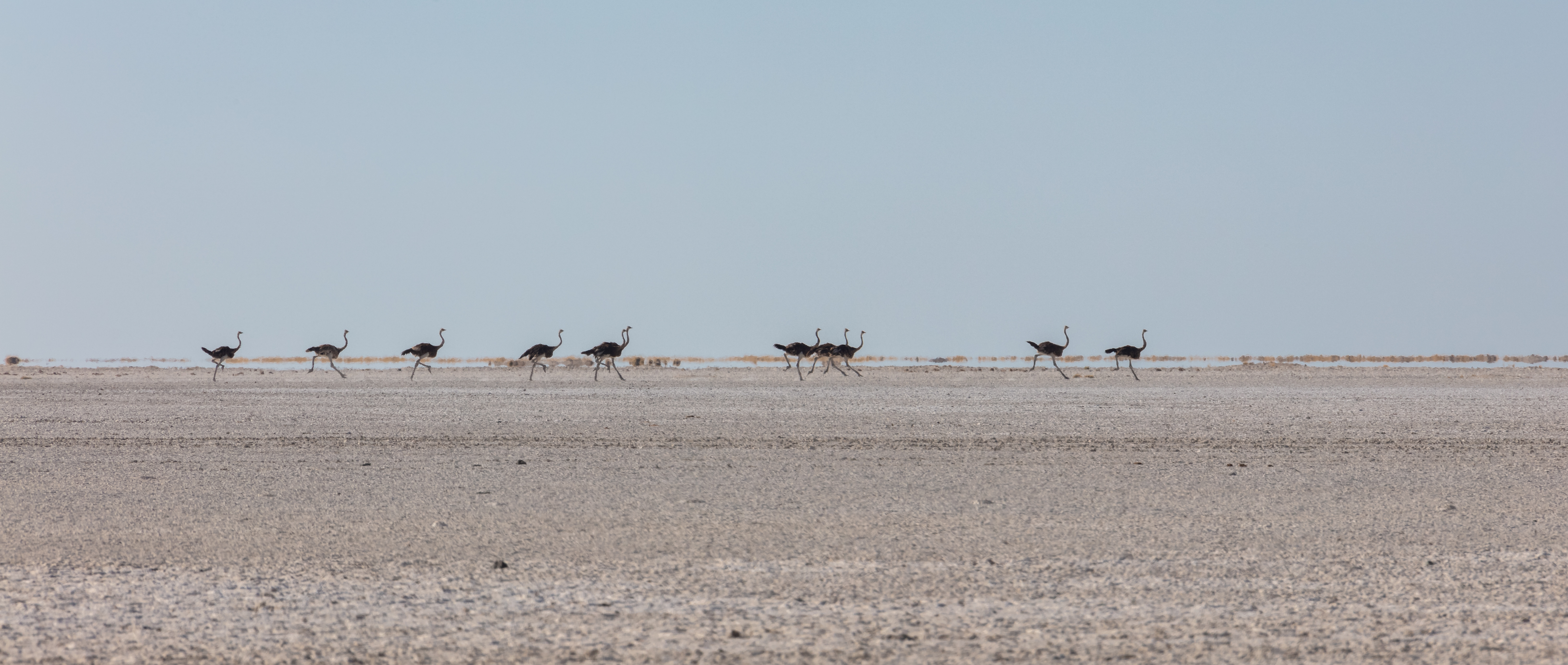
Ostriches (Struthio camelus) in the salt pan

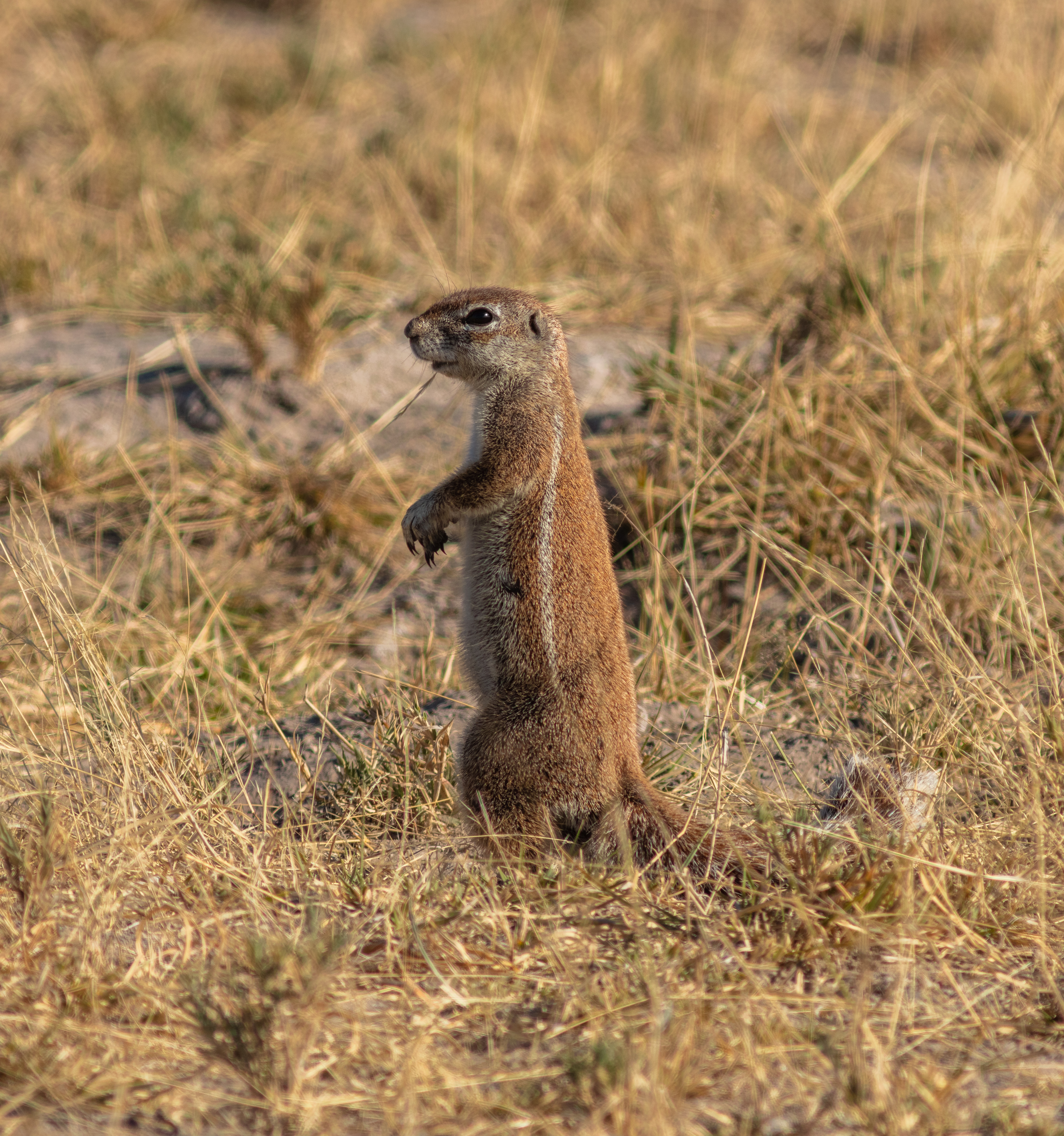
Cape ground squirrel (Xerus inauris)

== See also ==
- Daphnia barbata
- Lovenula africana
- Sigara
- Top Gear: Botswana Special
- The Grand Tour: One For The Road
