= Sua Pan =

Topographic depression in the Makgadikgadi region of Botswana

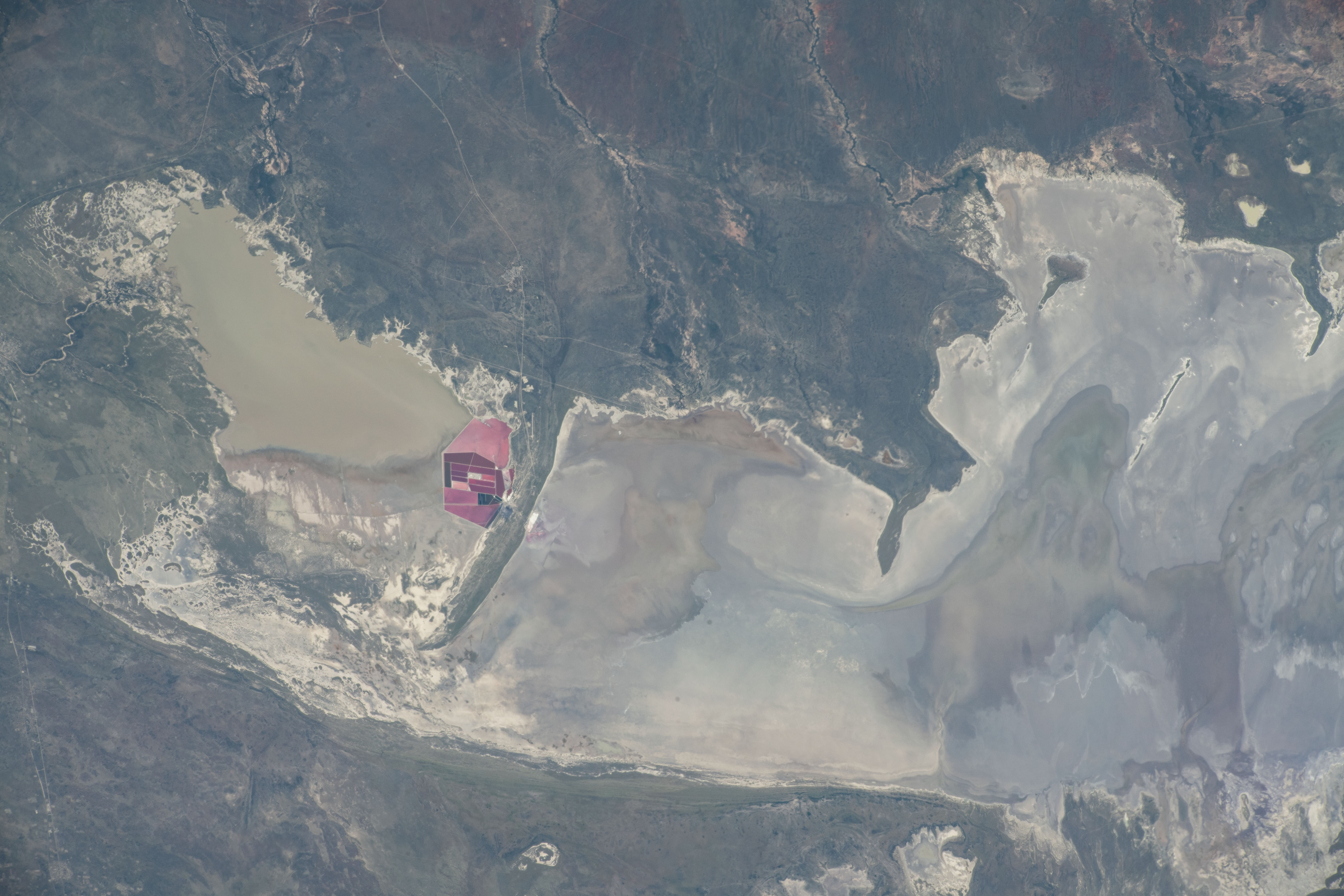
- Satellite picture showing the northern part of Sua Pan

- Location within Botswana

Geography
- Country: Botswana
- District: Kalahari Desert
- Population center: Sowa
- Coordinates: 20.99219°S 25.97289°E
- Interactive map of Sua Pan

The Sua Pan or Sowa Pan is a large natural topographic depression within the Makgadikgadi region of northeastern Botswana. It is located near the village of Sowa, whose name means salt in the language of the San. The Sua salt pan is one of three large pans within the Makgadikgadi, the other two being Nxai Pan and Nwetwe Pan.

The Sua Pan was first described to the European world by David Livingstone, pursuant to his explorations in this region. Significant archaeological recoveries have been made within the Nwetwe Pan, featuring Stone-Age tools from peoples who lived in this area when a large year-round lake occupied the Sua and Nwetwe Pans.

The Brines of Sua Pan being one of the largest playa lakes in the world spans approximately 24,000 square kilometers. While sodium chloride is the prime constituent, there are many other salts found within this area such as sodium carbonate, sodium bicarbonate, sodium sulfate, and minor amounts of potassium chloride (potash).

Currently, Sua Pan is a seasonal lake; it fills with water during the summer rainy season and retains water brought from the Nata River until April or May. Among the more successful wildlife conservation projects in Botswana was the community-initiated Nata Bird Sanctuary in the northeast of this area. It opened in 1993 and was awarded that year the "Tourism for Tomorrow Award" for the Southern Hemisphere. It is supported by members of four nearby villages, who have helped make it a success.

One of the tributaries of the Sua Pan is the Mosetse River. The village of Mosetse is named for it and lies along the river.

== Industry ==
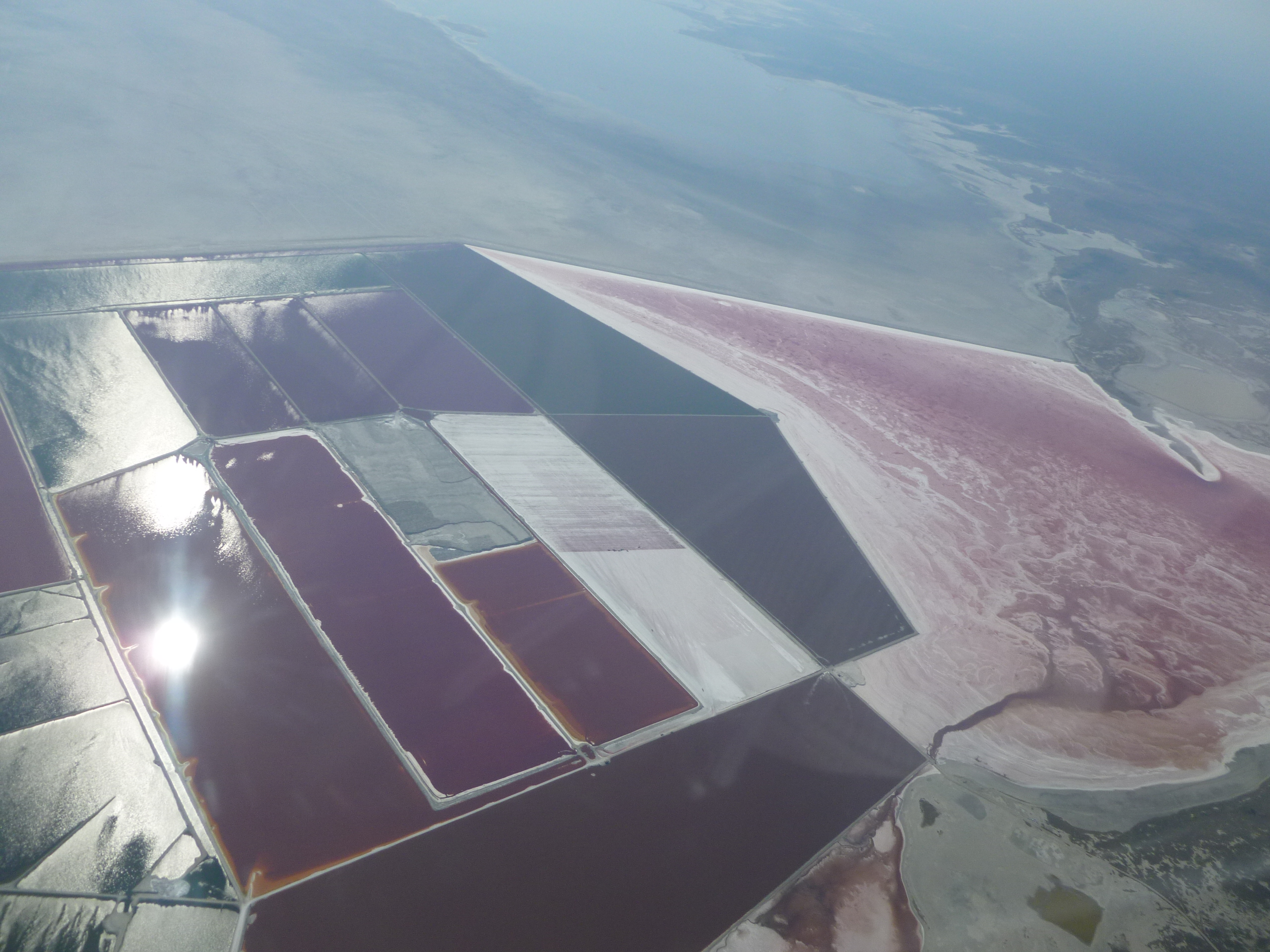
Pans used for sodium carbonate mining

Sua Pan is also the site of sodium carbonate (soda ash) mining company Botash. The company is half owned by the Botswana government and produces over 300,000 tonnes of soda ash and 450,000 tonnes of salt per year.

In addition to producing sodium carbonate, the mine also produces halite, sodium sulfate and sodium bicarbonate salts. The mine uses a variation of the Solvay process to produce their soda ash and byproducts.

== Transport ==
Sua Pan is the western terminus of the Francistown–Sua Pan 174.5 km railway line.

== See also ==
- Mosope River
- Semowane River
- Nata River

== Sources ==
- David Livingstone (1868) Missionary Travels and Researches in South Africa: Including a Sketch of Sixteen Years' Residence in the Interior of Africa, Harper Publishers.
- C.Michael Hogan (2008) Makgadikgadi, The Megalithic Portal, ed. A. Burnham
- Bryan Robert Davies and Keith F. Walker (1986), The Ecology of River Systems, Springer, 733 pages, ISBN 90-6193-540-7, ISBN 978-90-6193-540-7.
