= Nxai Pan =

Salt pan topographic depression in Botswana

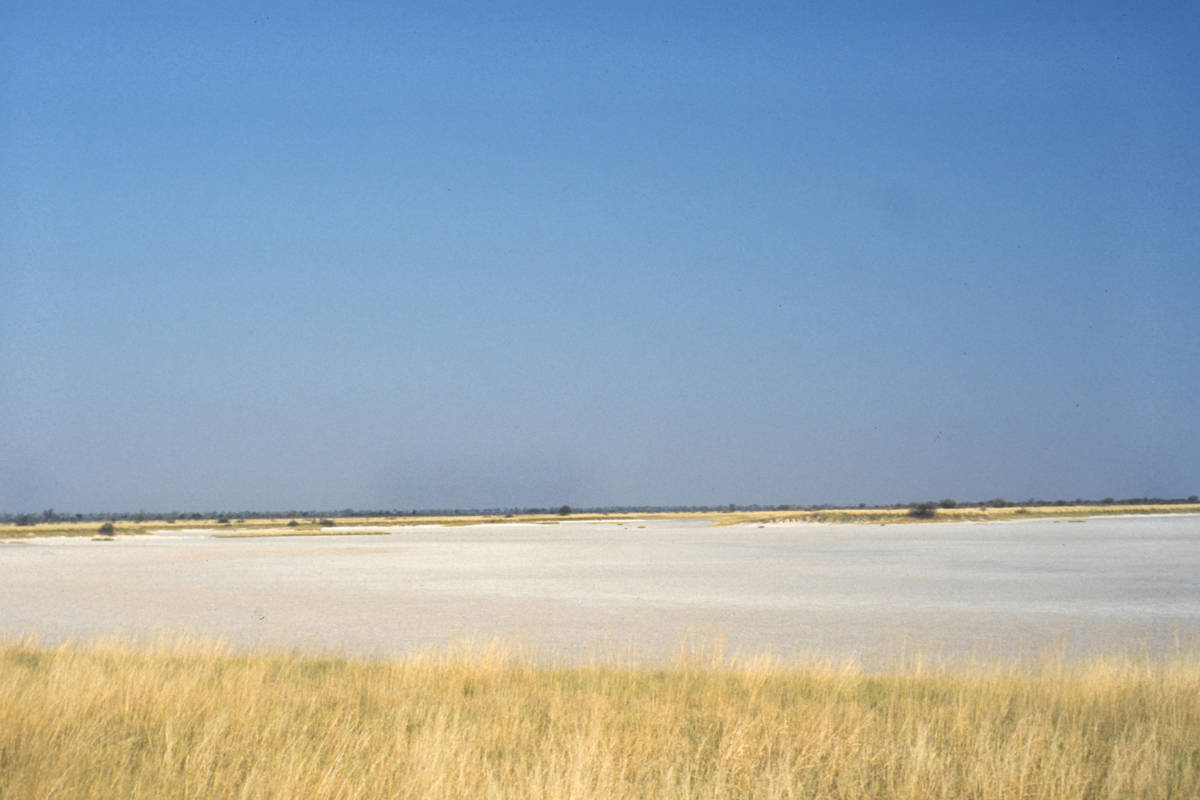
- Botswana Nxai Pan

- Location within Botswana

Geography
- Country: Botswana
- Coordinates: 19.9°S 24.75°E
- Interactive map of Nxai Pan

Nxai Pan is a large salt pan topographic depression which is part of the larger Makgadikgadi Pans in northeastern Botswana. It lies on the old Pandamatenga Trail, which until the 1960s was used for overland cattle drives. The area is speckled with umbrella acacias and is said to resemble the Serengeti in Tanzania. The Nxai Pan was added to the National Park System to augment the Makgadikgadi Pans National Park, thus providing an enlarged contiguous area of natural protection.

The 'x' represents a palatal click sound. Click sounds are typical of the Khoisan languages and some southern Bantu languages.

== Wildlife ==
This landform is a major part of the Nxai Pan National Park, and is a seasonal home to large herds of zebra and wildebeest. In the rainy season between December and April the pan becomes grassy and attracts these animals in their tens of thousands, along with smaller numbers of gemsbok, eland and red hartebeest.

== See also ==
- Nwetwe Pan
- Sua Pan
