= Ntwetwe Pan =

Salt pan within the Makgadikgadi region of Botswana

- Location within Botswana

Geography
- Location: Makgadikgadi region of Botswana
- Country: Botswana
- County: Kalahari Desert
- Coordinates: 20.65°S 25.22°E
- Interactive map of Ntwetwe Pan

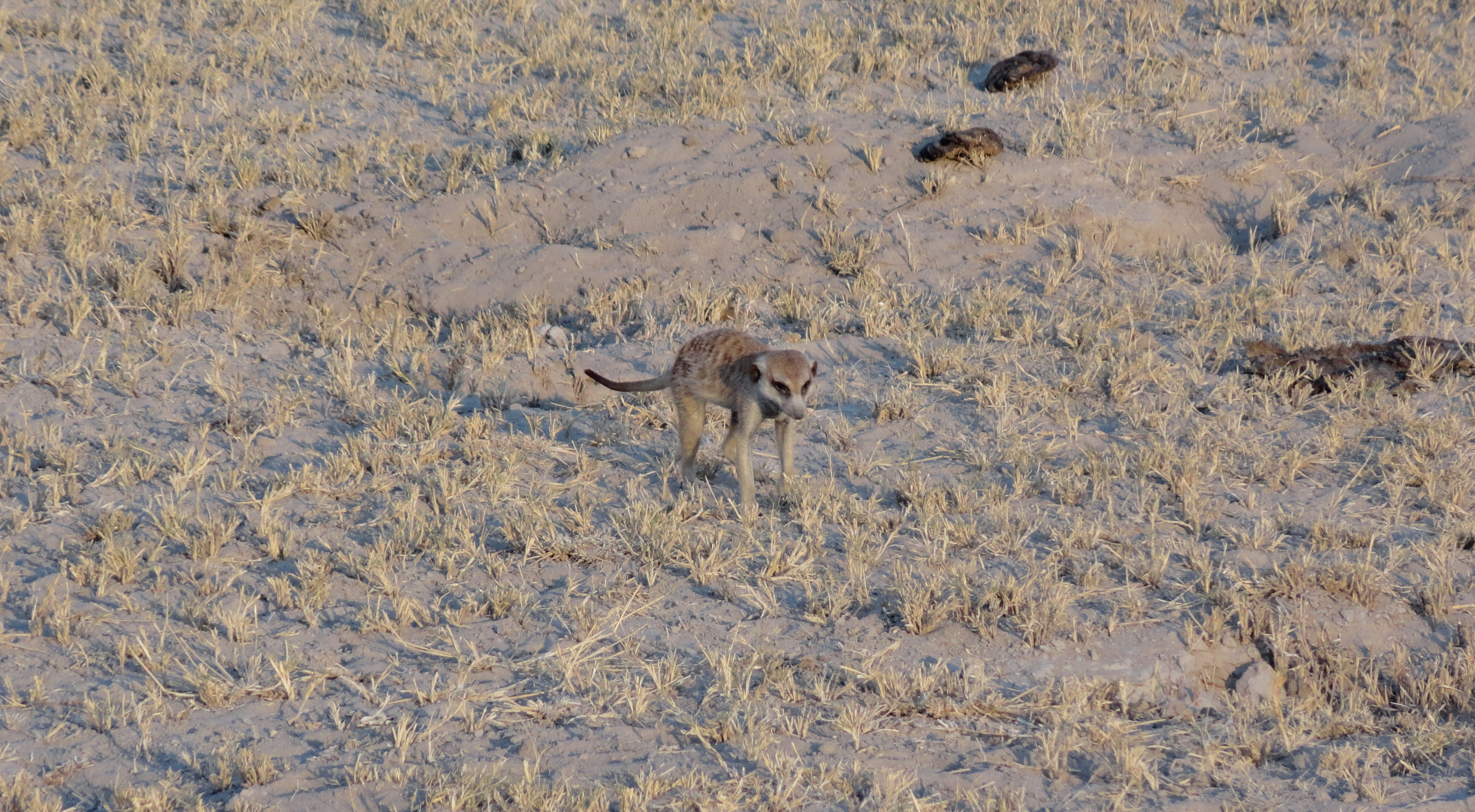
Meerkat in Ntwetwe Pan, Botswana

The Ntwetwe Pan is a large salt pan within the Makgadikgadi region of Botswana. The Ntwetwe is one of three large pans within the Makgadikgadi, the other two being Nxai Pan and Sua Pan. Ntwetwe Pan is now a seasonal lake which fills up in the rainy season. Ntwetwe was first described to the European world by David Livingstone, pursuant to his explorations in this region. Significant archaeological recoveries have occurred within the Nwetwe Pan, including Stone Age tools from people who lived in this area, in an earlier time of prehistory when a large year-round lake occupied the Nwetwe Pan area within the Makgadikgadi.

== See also ==
- Semowane River
