= Okavango Delta =

River delta in Botswana

UNESCO World Heritage Site
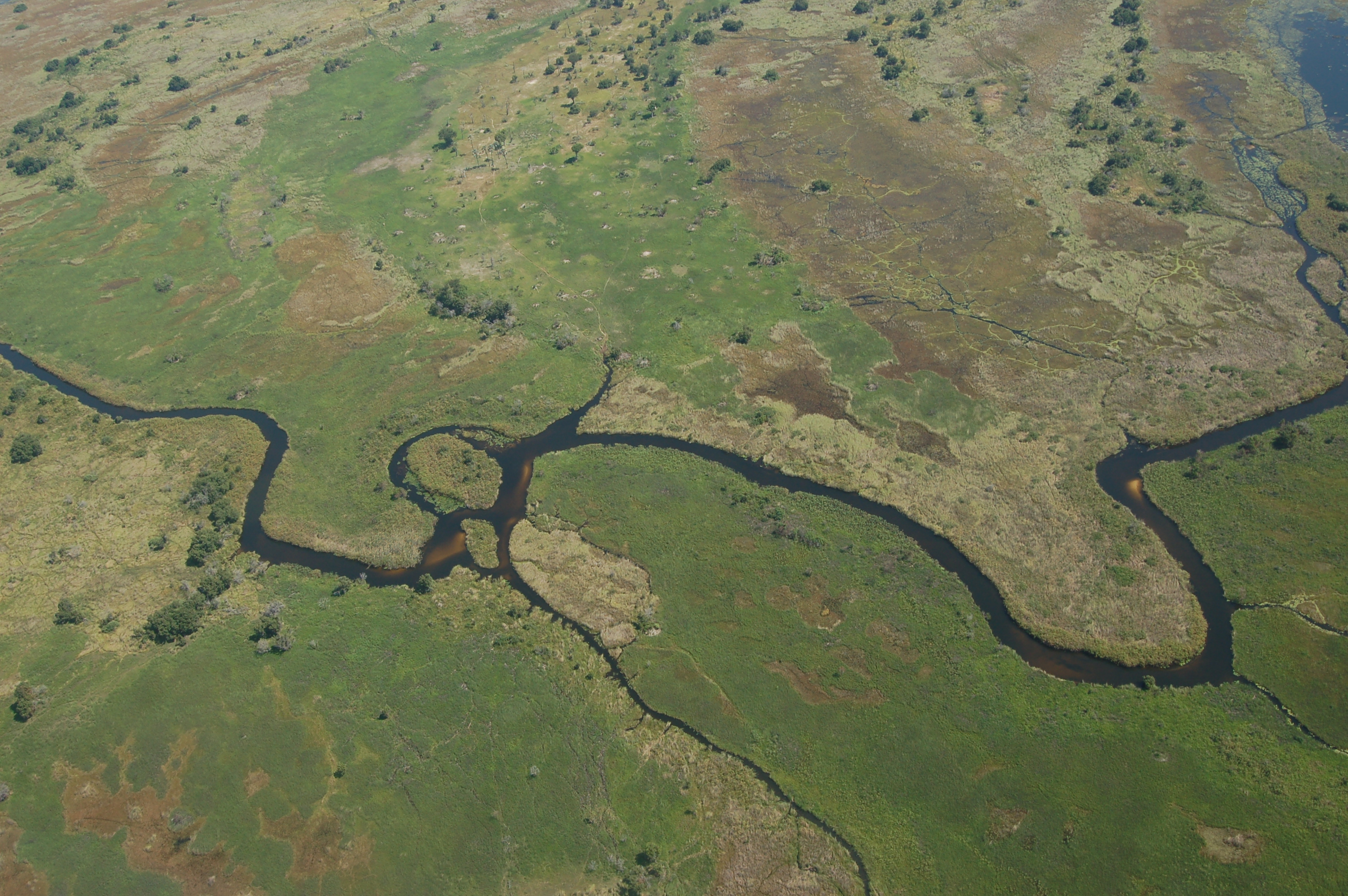
- The Okavango basin from above

- Location within Botswana
- Location: Botswana
- Criteria: Natural: vii, ix, x
- Reference: 1432
- Inscription: 2014 (38th Session)
- Area: 2,023,590 ha (5,000,400 acres)
- Buffer zone: 2,286,630 ha (5,650,400 acres)
- Coordinates: 19°24′S 22°54′E

Ramsar Wetland
- Official name: Okavango Delta System
- Designated: 12 September 1996
- Reference no.: 879

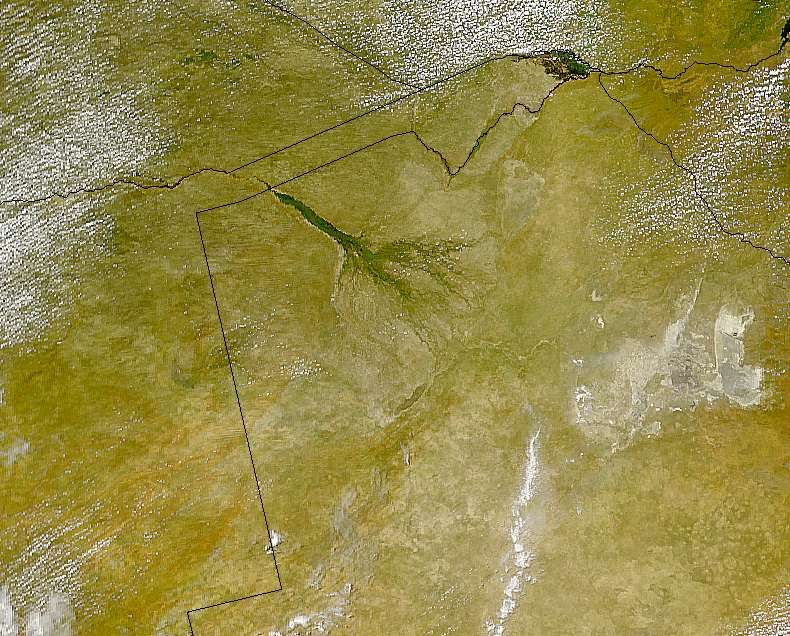
Satellite image (SeaWiFS) of Okavango Delta, with national borders added

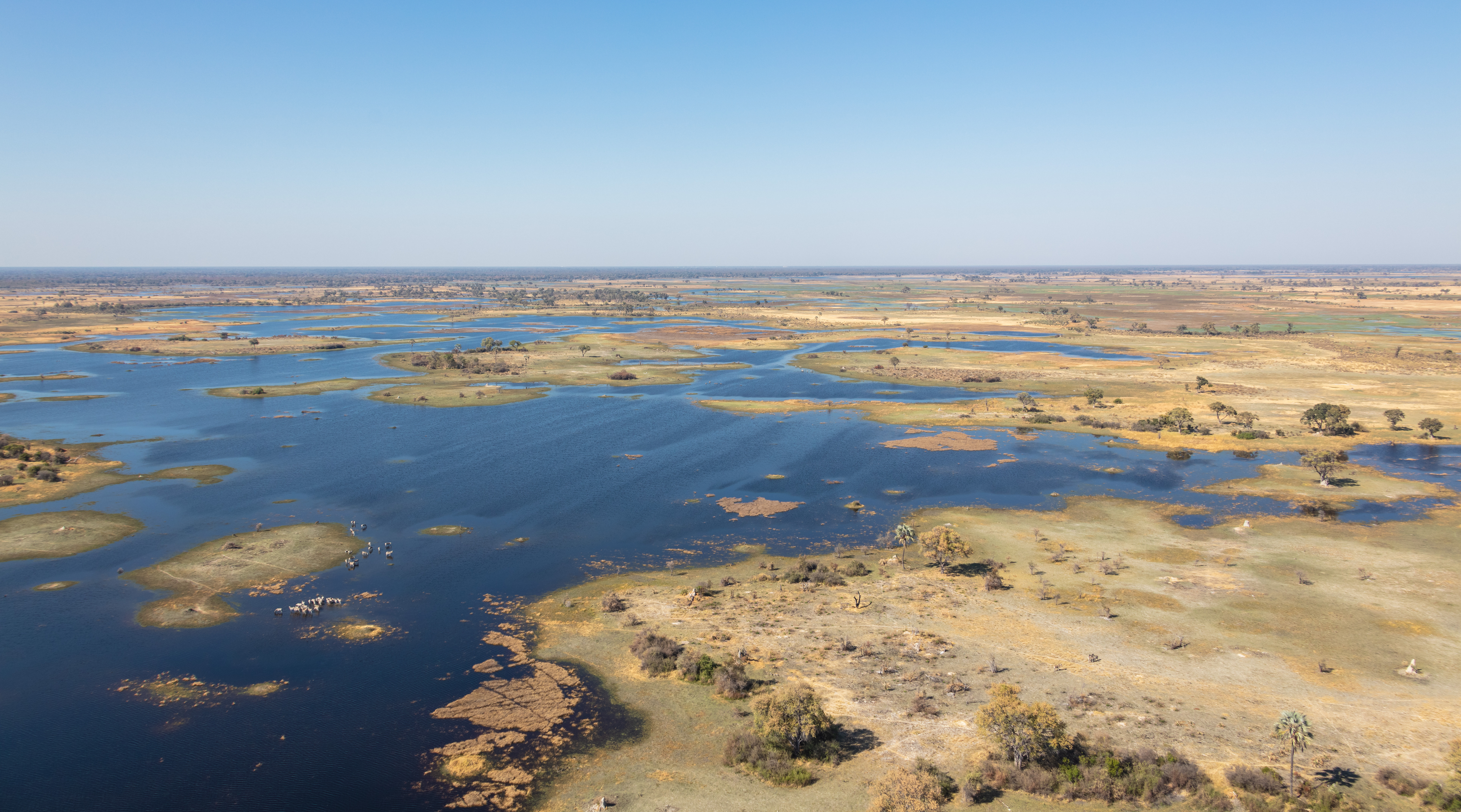
Typical region in the Okavango Delta, with free canals and lakes, swamps and islands

The Okavango Delta or Okavango Grassland is a vast inland delta in Botswana formed where the Okavango River reaches a tectonic trough at an elevation of 930–1,000 m (3,050–3,280 ft) in the central part of the endorheic basin of the Kalahari Desert.

It is a UNESCO World Heritage Site as one of the few interior delta systems that do not flow into a sea or ocean, with a wetland system that is largely intact. Instead, the floodwater spreads over sandy floodplains and islands, and a large share seeps downward into the shallow alluvial aquifer beneath, before it is taken up by plants. Nearly all the water reaching the delta is ultimately evaporated and transpired.

Each year, about 11 km^{3} (2.6 cu mi) of water spreads over the 6,000–15,000 km^{2} (2,300–5,800 sq mi) area. Some flood waters drain into Lake Ngami. The area was once part of Lake Makgadikgadi, an ancient lake that had mostly dried up by the early Holocene.

The Moremi Game Reserve is on the eastern side of the delta. The delta was named one of the Seven Natural Wonders of Africa, which were officially declared on 11 February 2013 in Arusha, Tanzania. On 22 June 2014, the Okavango Delta became the 1000th site to be officially inscribed on the UNESCO World Heritage List.

== Name ==
The name Okavango is derived from the Okavango River, which comes from Kavango, referring to the Kavango people of northern Namibia.

Older English spellings included Okovango, while some Namibian scholarship prefers Kavango when referring to the Namibian river and region. Historian Andreas Eckl notes that German colonial reports used Okavango, but the initial O- is not common in local Kavango languages, and has instead been attributed to Herero influence.

== Geography ==
=== Floods ===
The Okavango is formed by seasonal flooding. The Okavango River carries water from the summer (January–February) rainfall from the Angola highlands and the surge flows 1,200 km (750 mi) in around one month. The waters then spread over the 37,500 km^{2} (14,500 sq mi) area of the delta over the next four months (March–June).

The high temperature of the delta contribute to rapid transpiration and evaporation, resulting in three cycles of rising and falling water levels that were not fully understood until the early 20th century. Flood levels peak between June and August, during Botswana's dry winter months, when the delta swells to three times its permanent size, attracting animals from kilometres around and creating one of Africa's greatest concentrations of wildlife.

The delta is very flat, with a height variation of less than 2 m (6 ft 7 in) across its 15,000 km^{2} (5,800 sq mi), while the water drops about 60 m (200 ft) from Mohembo to Maun.

=== Lagoons ===
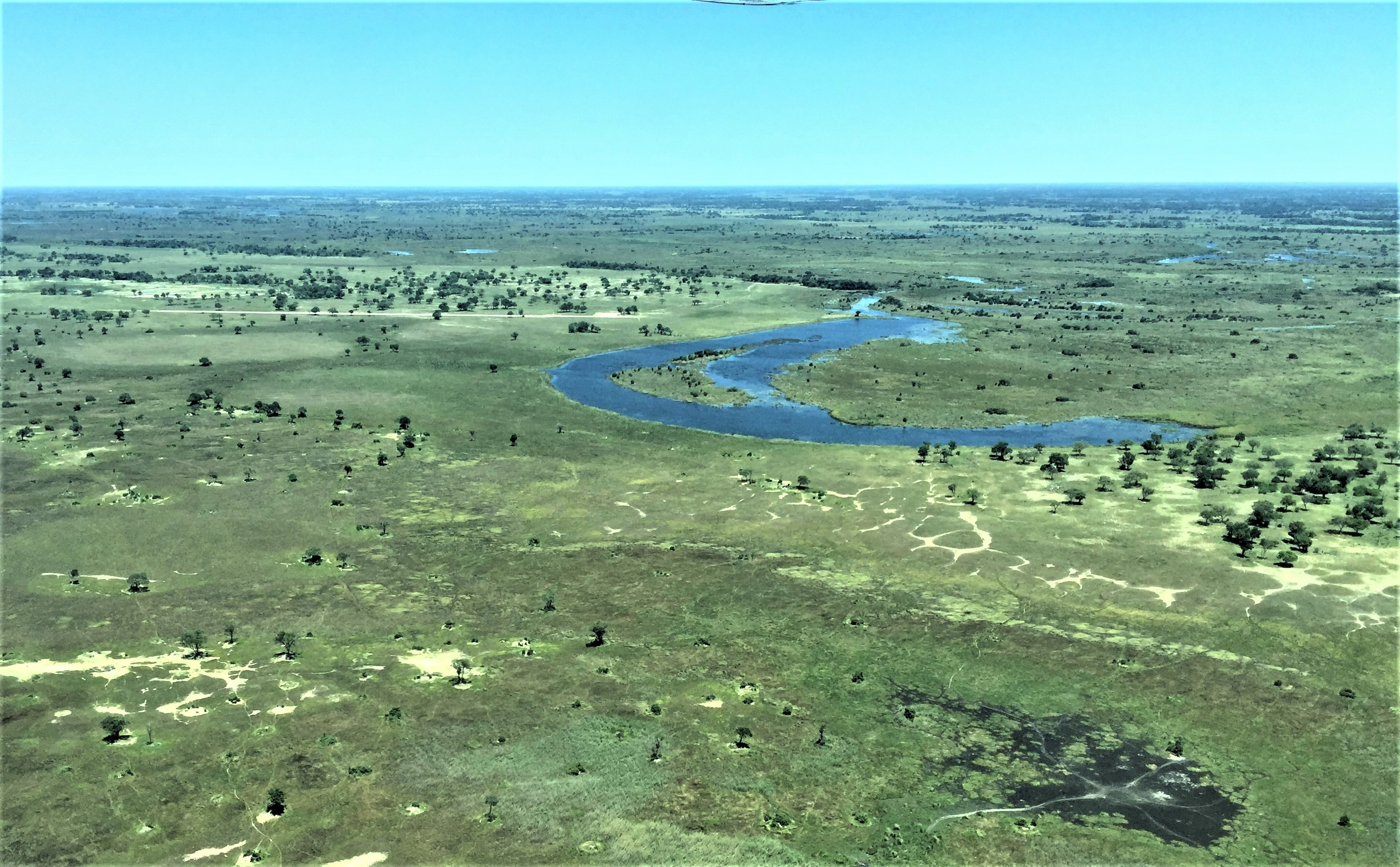
Shinde Lagoon, seen from the air

When the water levels gradually recede, water remains in major canals and river beds, in waterholes and in a number of larger lagoons, which then attract increasing numbers of animals.

=== Salt islands ===
The agglomeration of salt around plant roots leads to barren white patches in the centre of many of the thousands of islands, which have become too salty to support plants, except for the occasional salt-resistant palm tree. Trees and grasses grow in the sand around the edges of the islands that have not become too salty yet.About 70% of the islands began as termite mounds (often Macrotermes spp.), where a tree then takes root on the mound of soil.

=== Chief's Island ===
Chief's Island (19°12′S 22°48′E), the largest island in the delta, was formed by a fault line which uplifted an area over 70 km long (43 mi) and 15 km wide (9.3 mi). Historically, it was reserved as an exclusive hunting area for the chief, but is now a protected area for wildlife. It now provides the core area for much of the resident wildlife when the waters rise.

== Hydrology ==
The inflow channels of the Okavango Delta originate primarily from the Okavango River, which is formed by the confluence of the Cubango and Cuito rivers in Angola before flowing through Namibia into Botswana. Upon entering the delta near Mohembo, the river divides into an intricate network of distributary channels, floodplains, lagoons, and permanent swamps that sustain one of the world's largest inland deltas.

Major distributary channels include the Boro, Maunachira, Thaoge, Santantadibe, Nqoga, and Jao systems. These channels redistribute seasonal floodwaters across the delta, creating a dynamic mosaic of permanent wetlands and seasonally inundated floodplains that support exceptional biodiversity.Approximately 96–98% of the water entering the delta is lost through evapotranspiration, groundwater recharge, and evaporation, while only a small proportion leaves the system through the Thamalakane and Boteti rivers.

== Climate ==
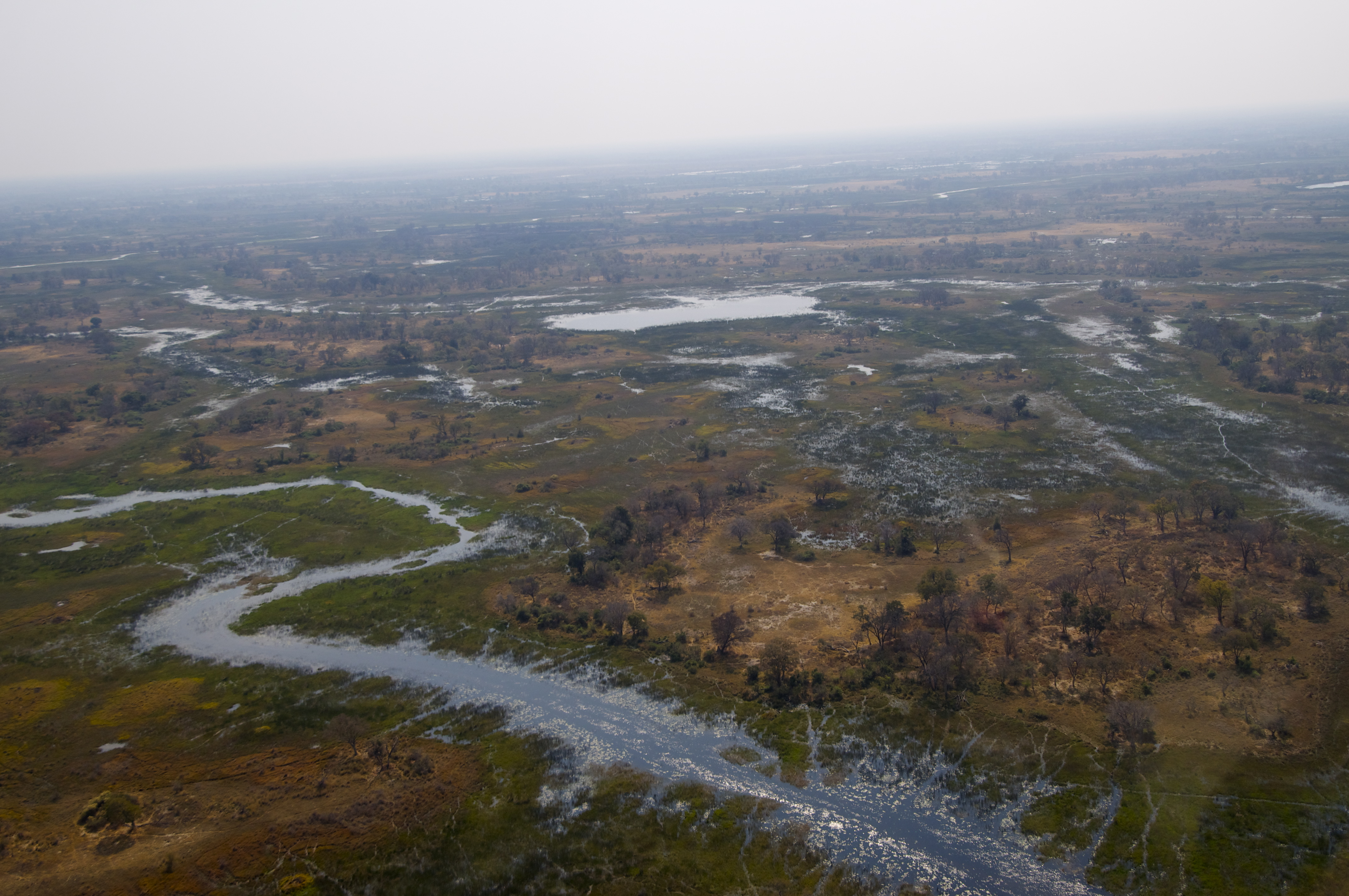
Aerial view of delta as floodwaters recede, August 2012

The Delta's profuse greenery is not the result of a wet climate; rather, it is an oasis in an arid country. The average annual rainfall is 450 mm (18 in) (approximately one-third that of its Angolan catchment area) and most of it falls between December and March in the form of heavy afternoon thunderstorms.

December to February are hot wet months with daytime temperatures as high as 40 °C (104 °F), warm nights, and humidity levels fluctuating between 50 and 80%. From March to May, the temperature reduces, with a maximum of 30 °C (86 °F) during the day and mild to cool nights. The rains quickly dry up leading into the dry, cool winter months of June to August. Daytime temperatures at this time of year are mild to warm, but the temperature falls considerably after sunset. Nights can be cold in the delta, with temperatures barely above freezing. Frost is sometimes seen over the winter.

The September to November span has the heat and atmospheric pressure build up once more, as the dry season slides into the rainy season. October is the most challenging month for visitors: daytime temperatures often surpass 40 °C (104 °F) and the dryness is only occasionally broken by a sudden cloudburst.

== Fauna of the delta ==
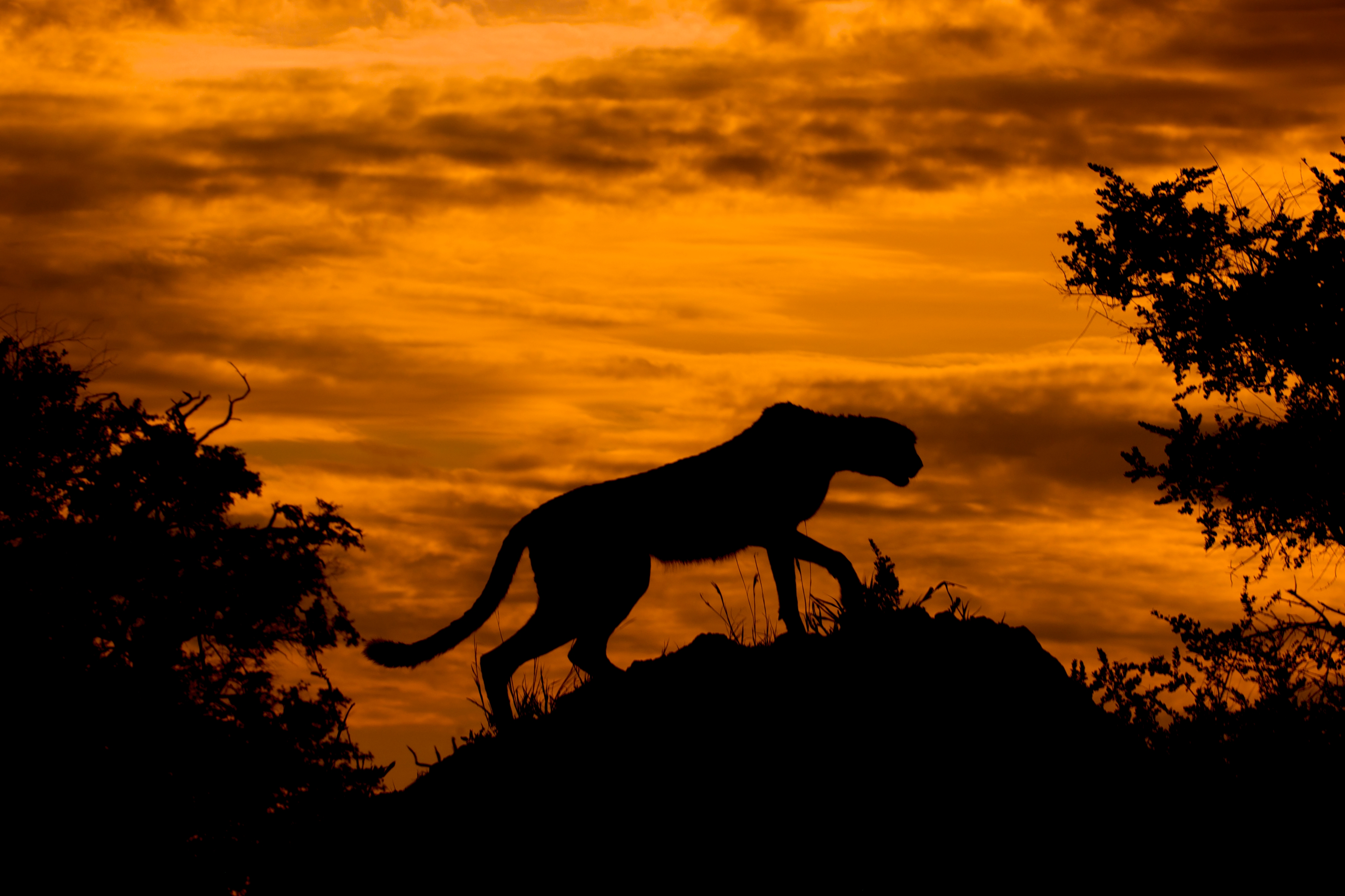
A cheetah silhouetted against a sunset in the delta

The Okavango Delta is both a permanent and seasonal home to a wide variety of wildlife. All of the big five game animals, the lion, leopard, African buffalo, African bush elephant, black and white rhinoceros are present.

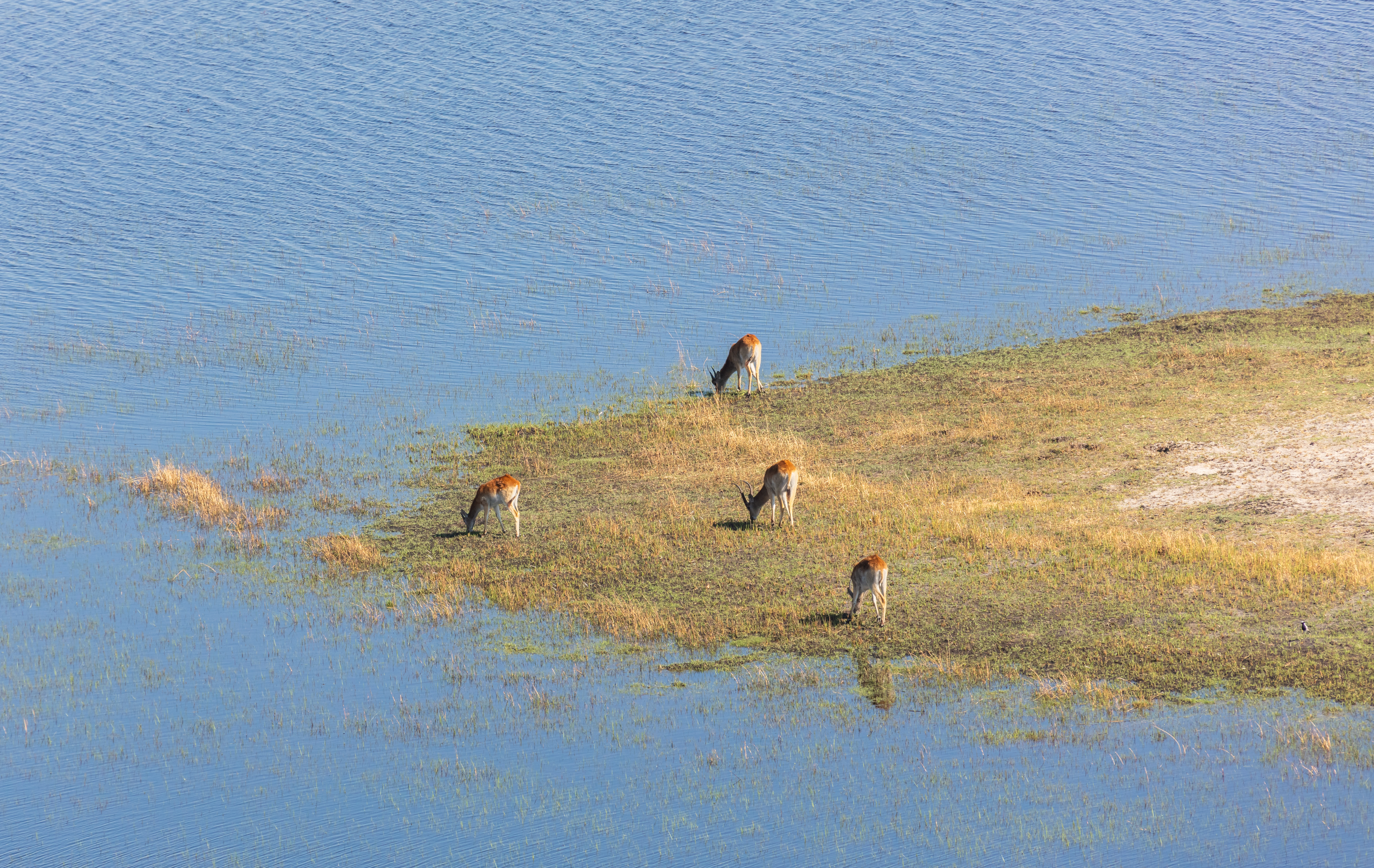
Small gathering of lechwe antelopes, Okavango Delta

The most abundant large mammal is the red lechwe, with estimates suggesting approximately 88,000 individuals. Other species include the giraffe, blue wildebeest, plains zebra, hippopotamus, impala, common eland, greater kudu, sable antelope, roan antelope, puku, waterbuck, sitatunga, tsessebe, cheetah, African wild dog, spotted hyena, black-backed jackal, caracal, serval, aardvark, aardwolf, bat-eared fox, African savanna hare, honey badger, common warthog, chacma baboon, vervet monkey and Nile crocodile.

The delta also hosts over 400 bird species, including the helmeted guineafowl, African fish eagle, Pel's fishing owl, Egyptian goose, South African shelduck, African jacana, African skimmer, marabou stork, crested crane, African spoonbill, African darter, southern ground hornbill, wattled crane, lilac-breasted roller, secretary bird and common ostrich.

Since 2005, the protected area has been considered a Lion Conservation Unit together with Hwange National Park.

By 2019, about 150 rhinocerosses were living in the northern Okavango Delta. From 2020 to 2021, 92 rhinos were killed by poachers in the delta region leaving only 40 individuals, prompting the government to move those rhinos out of the Okavango Delta.

=== Fish ===
The Okavango Delta is home to 71 fish species, including the tigerfish, species of tilapia, and various species of catfish. Fish sizes range from the 1.4 m (4.6 ft) African sharptooth catfish to the 3.2 cm (1.3 in) sickle barb. The same species occur in the Zambezi River, indicating an historic link between the two river systems.

== Flora ==
The Okavango Delta is home to 1068 plants which belong to 134 families and 530 genera. There are five important plant communities in the perennial swamp: Papyrus cyperus in the deeper waters, Miscanthus in the shallowly flooded sites, and Phragmites australis, Typha capensis and Pycreus in between. The swamp-dominant species, which are usually found in the perennial swamp, also extend far into the seasonally inundated area. Papyrus cyperus reeds beds grow best in slow flowing waters of medium depth and are prominent at the channel sides. On the islands and mainlands edges above the flooded grasslands different communities of flora are found. These species are located according to their water preference: for instance Philenoptera violacea requires little water, is found at the highest elevations in the perennial swamps, and is common on drier seasonal swamp islands. Trees restricted to islands within the perennial swamp are a mixture of the palm Hyphaene petersiana and acacias.

The plants of the delta play an important role in preventing erosion. The banks or levees of a river normally have a high mud content, and this combines with the sand in the river's load to continuously build up the river banks. The river's load in the delta consists almost entirely of sand, because the clean waters of the Okavango contain little mud. The plants capture the sand, acting as the glue and making up for the lack of mud, and in the process creating further islands on which more plants can take root.

== People ==
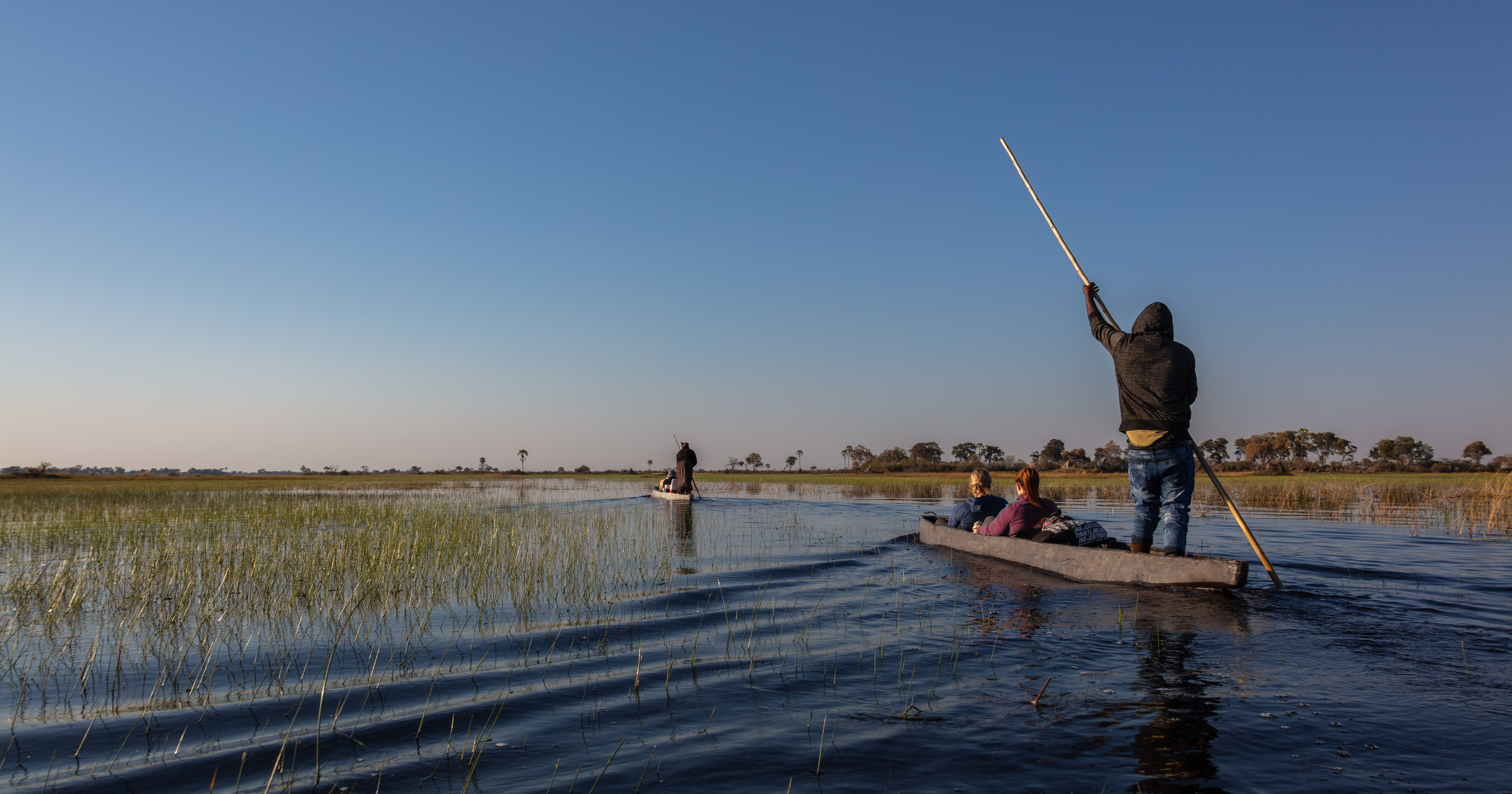
Hambukushu guide poles his makoro on delta floodwaters

The Okavango Delta peoples consist of five ethnic groups, each with its own ethnic identity and language:

- the Hambukushu (also known as Mbukushu, Bukushu, Bukusu, Mabukuschu, Ghuva, Haghuva),
- the Dceriku (Dxeriku, Diriku, Gciriku, Gceriku, Giriku, Niriku),
- the Wayeyi (Bayei, Bayeyi, Yei),
- the Bugakhwe (Kxoe, Khwe, Kwengo, Barakwena, G|anda)
- the ǁanikhwe (Gxanekwe, ǁtanekwe, River Bushmen, Swamp Bushmen, Gǁani, ǁani, Xanekwe).

The Hambukushu, Dceriku, and Wayeyi have traditionally engaged in mixed economies of millet/sorghum agriculture, fishing, hunting, the collection of wild plant foods, and pastoralism.

The Bugakhwe and ǁanikwhe are Bushmen, who have traditionally practised fishing, hunting, and the collection of wild plant foods; Bugakhwe used both forest and riverine resources, while the ǁanikhwe mostly focused on riverine resources. The Hambukushu, Dceriku, and Bugakhwe are present along the Okavango River in Angola and in the Caprivi Strip of Namibia, and small numbers of Hambukushu and Bugakhwe are in Zambia, as well. Within the Okavango Delta, over the past 150 years or so, Hambukushu, Dceriku, and Bugakhwe have inhabited the panhandle and the Magwegqana in the northeastern delta. ǁanikhwe have inhabited the panhandle and the area along the Boro River through the delta, as well as the area along the Boteti River.

The Wayeyi have inhabited the area around Seronga as well as the southern delta around Maun, and a few Wayeyi live in their putative ancestral home in the Caprivi Strip. Within the past 20 years many people from all over the Okavango have migrated to Maun, the late 1960s and early 1970s over 4,000 Hambukushu refugees from Angola were settled in the area around Etsha in the western Panhandle.

The Okavango Delta has been under the political control of the Batawana (a Tswana nation) since the late 18th century. Led by the house of Mathiba I, the leader of a Bangwato offshoot, the Batawana established complete control over the delta in the 1850s as the regional ivory trade exploded. Most Batawana, however, have traditionally lived on the edges of the delta, due to the threat that the tsetse fly poses to their cattle. During a hiatus of some 40 years, the tsetse fly retreated and most Batawana lived in the swamps from 1896 through the late 1930s. Since then, the edge of the delta has become increasingly crowded with its growing human and livestock populations.

== Tourism ==
The wilderness of the Okavango Delta and its wildlife attracts hundreds of thousands of tourists a year, with the town of Maun serving as a gateway the region.

Modern safari tourism developed during the late 1960s, when the first modern safari camps were built in the delta. Tourism products since expanded include high-end lodge safaris, mobile safaris, self-drive camping, birdwatching, game drives, scenic flights, guided walks, recreational fishing and mokoro canoe excursions.

Botswana has generally promoted a high-cost, low-volume tourism model in the Okavango region, intended to limit environmental impacts while generating high visitor expenditure. A 2014 UNESCO report found there were 2,129 tourist beds in the area. In 2017 the delta received 52,638 visitors, of whom 43,363 were international tourists and 9,275 were locals. This is a small fraction of the 1 million international tourists Botswana receives annually.

== Molapos (water streams) ==
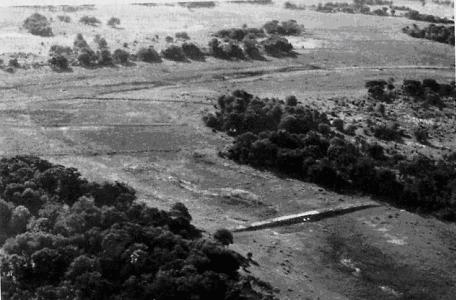
Flood-control bunds for flood recession cropping in the molapo of the Okavango, Botswana

After the flooding season, the waters in the lower parts of the delta, near the base, recede, leaving moisture behind in the soil. This residual moisture is used for planting fodder and other crops that can thrive on it. This land is locally known as molapo.

During 1974 to 1978, the floods were more intensive than normal and flood recession cropping was not possible, so severe food and fodder shortages occurred. In response, the Molapo Development Project was initiated. It protected the molapo areas with bunds to control the flooding and prevent severe flooding. The bunds are provided with sluice gates so the stored water can be released and flood recession cropping can start.

== Possible threats ==
One possible threat is oil exploration by Canadian company ReconAfrica. Initial exploration in April 2021 revealed oil deposits in sedimentary rock. Environmentalists are concerned that the project will have a negative ecological impact and that some of the main bodies of water could be threatened. ReconAfrica has stated, "There will be no damage to the ecosystem from the planned activities."

The Namibian government has presented plans to build a hydropower station in the Zambezi Region, which would regulate the Okavango's flow to some extent. While proponents argue that the effect would be minimal, environmentalists argue that this project could destroy most of the rich animal and plant life in the delta. Other threats include local human encroachment and regional extraction of water in both Angola and Namibia.

South African filmmaker and conservationist Rick Lomba warned in the 1980s of the threat of cattle invasion to the area. His documentary The End of Eden portrayed his lobbying on behalf of the delta.

The Okavango catchment is projected to experience decreasing annual rainfall as well as increasing temperatures as a result of global warming. The effects of global warming are likely to result in reductions in the extent of floodplains in the Okavango Delta, which will have significant impacts on water availability as well as livestock rearing and agricultural activities in the region.

Conservation work by Conservation International Botswana in the Okavango Delta region has included education and policy engagement as well as research and monitoring such as aerial wildlife surveys and rapid biological appraisal work.

== See also ==
- Kalahari Basin
