= Christianity in Botswana =

More than 70% of the population of Botswana is Christian. Most are members of the Catholic Church, Seventh-day Adventist Church, Anglican, United Congregational Church of Southern Africa, the Methodist Church of Southern Africa, and African independent churches. Anglicans are part of the Church of the Province of Central Africa. The Catholic Church includes about 5% of the nation's population.

The number of Pentecostal churches has been rising in the 21st century. Churchgoers participate in night prayers, evangelism and crusades. Midweek Bible study services are conducted in some churches. In these meetings, prayers are offered for the church, members, community, and leaders in the nation. Churches in Botswana include Pentecostal Protestant Church, Assemblies of God, Apostolic Faith Mission, Eloyi Christian Church, Pentecostal Holiness Church, Dutch Reformed Church in Botswana, Good News Ministries, Christ Embassy, Bible Life Ministries, Victory International Centre (VIC), Royal Assembly Ministries Int’l, First Love Church, and Winners Chapel International. The Eastern Orthodox Church and Serbian Orthodox Church are present. Many of the churches are members of the Botswana Council of Churches.

The churches normally meet occasionally to worship together under the name Evangelical Fellowship of Botswana. This body is like an organization of churches and it is the voice of the church.

== History ==
One of the first missionaries to bring the gospel to Botswana was David Livingstone.

== Major denominations ==
According to the country’s 2011 census, 79% of the population are members of Christian groups, typically as Anglicans, Methodists, or as members of the United Congregational Church of Southern Africa.

A survey identified the distribution among these groups as 66% Protestant, 7% Catholics and 1% Other.

=== Catholic Church ===
The Catholic Church in Botswana is part of the worldwide Catholic Church, under the spiritual leadership of the Pope in the Vatican City. Catholics represent about 5–6% of the total population.

Initially Catholic missionaries were not allowed in Botswana by native tribes at the urging of Protestant missionaries who arrived first. Missionaries began to work in Botswana in 1928, and were noted for setting up schools and clinics. In 2006 the church in Francistown started a program to treat refugees infected with AIDS with anti retro viral therapy. As of 2011 there were thirteen seminarians preparing for the priesthood in Botswana.

The church in Botswana is organised into the Diocese of Gaborone, which serves the southern portion of the country, and the Diocese of Francistown, which serves the faithful of northern communities.

=== Church of Jesus Christ of Latter-day Saints ===
The first branch was organised in 1991 with fewer than 100 members. As of 2022, there were 4,031 members in 16 congregations in Botswana.

=== Dutch Reformed Church ===
The Dutch Reformed Church in Botswana was founded by Swiss missionaries led by the Rev. Henri Gronin begun working in 1863 among the tribe Bakgatla, Kgafela in Saulsport and Rustenburg in South Africa. In 1870 part of the tribe moved north to Botswana and the missionaries followed them. The great chief was baptised and most of the tribe followed him. In 1966 when Botswana become independent, a Synod of the Reformed Church was formed. In the 1970s the church gained independence. The church in the following years expanded to Basarwa, Bakalanga and Bakgatla.

The denomination has 6,000 members and 13 parishes with 50 house fellowships in 2 presbyteries and one Synod. The 14 churches are in : Muchudi, Muchudi East, Muchudi West, Sikwane, Gaborone, Tlokweng, Lobatse, Kgalagadi, Ghanzi, Maun, Makaleng, Selebi Phikwe, Boseja (Mochudi).

The church subscribe the Reformed confessions:

- Apostles Creed
- Nicene Creed
- Canons of Dort
- Heidelberg Catechism.

The church is member of the World Communion of Reformed Churches. It is also a member of the Botswana Council of Churches.

=== Evangelical Lutheran Church ===
The Evangelical Lutheran Church in Botswana is an Evangelical Lutheran church. It has a membership of 22,000, and has been a member of the Lutheran World Federation since 1986. It is also affiliated with its regional expression, the Lutheran Communion in Southern Africa. The church's head is Bishop Mothusi Letlhage. It is a member of the Botswana Council of Churches.

== Youth programs ==
While children were treated as small adults during the colonial era, the 1800s brought a wave of Sunday school programs (Protestants) and parochial schools (Catholics) specifically for that young population. By the late 1800s, over half of Botswana's young members were attending elementary schools run by local parishes.

== Beliefs and attitudes ==
- 19 percent of Botswana Christians: believe in salvation through Jesus Christ, attend church regularly, study the Bible, invest in personal faith development through a church community, accept church leadership positions, and believe they are obligated to evangelize to others.
- 20 percent are Professing Christians. These persons are also committed to "accepting Christ as Savior and Lord" with an emphasis on personal spirituality over organized religion.
- 24 percent are Liturgical Christians, predominantly Lutheran and Roman Catholic. They are regular churchgoers, exhibit a high level of spiritual activity, and recognize the authority of the church.
- 16 percent are Private Christians. They own a Bible, but rarely read it. Only about one-third attend church. They believe in God and good works, but not necessarily within a church context. This was the largest and youngest segment. Almost none are church leaders.
- 21 percent are Cultural Christians. They identify as Christians, yet they do not view Jesus as essential to salvation, exhibiting minimal religious behaviors and attitudes favoring a universality theology.

=== Conversion ===
A study from 2015 estimated that about 100 Botswana Muslims convert to Christianity each year, most of whom belong to an evangelical or Pentecostal community. It has been reported that conversion into Christianity is significantly increasing among East Asians.

== Education ==
The majority of Botswana Christians attend co-educational public schools, mostly government operated. The Christian schools were built by churches such as Moeding College for the United Congregational Church of Southern Africa, and St. Joseph's College (established by the Roman Catholic Church). Although the schools are Christian schools, Botswana's government participates in their development, related infrastructure, and hiring practices (particularly in hiring teachers).

== Media ==
Every week day public channel BTV broadcasts short religious programs.

== See also ==
- Religion in Botswana
- Islam in Botswana
