= Religion in Botswana =

Religion in Botswana (2022 census)
1. Christianity (86.5%)
2. No religion (7.10%)
3. Traditional faiths (4.60%)
4. Other religions (1.80%)

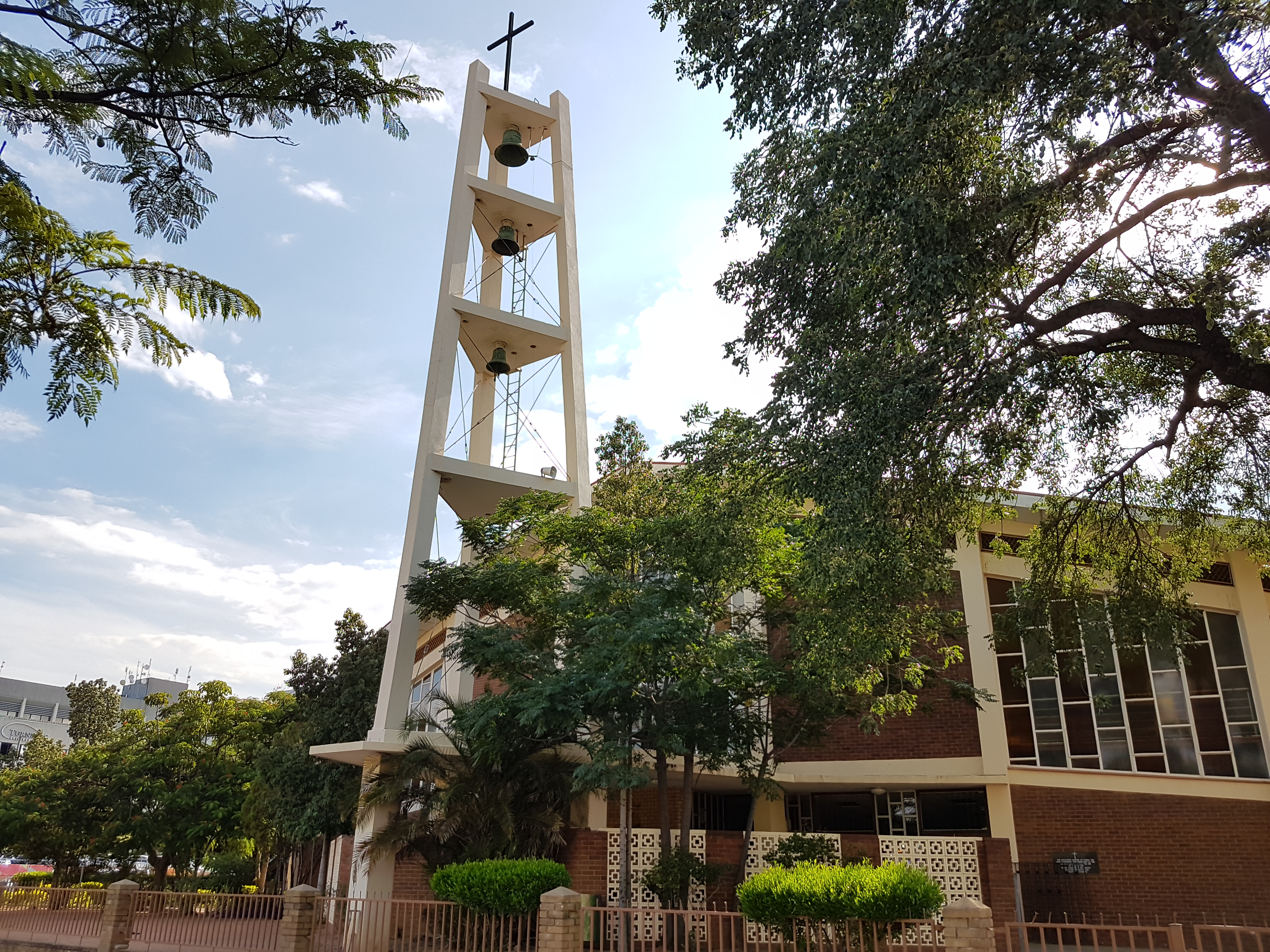
Christ the King Cathedral in the capital Gaborone.

Christianity is the largest religion in Botswana, representing 86.5% of the total population according to the latest census. However, the country is officially secular and allows freedom of religious practice.

Christianity arrived in Botswana in mid 1870s, with the arrival of European missionaries. The conversion process was quicker than neighbouring southern African countries because regional hereditary tribal chiefs locally called Dikgosi converted to Christianity, which triggered the entire group they led to convert as well. Christmas and Easter are recognised as public holidays.

== History ==
Before the arrival of Christianity, Animism was the prevailing belief system of the country.

The London Missionary Society sent the first Christian missionaries to Botswana in 1812. Other missionary groups were restricted by Motswana chiefs to avoid religious conflict. The missionaries were welcomed because the tribal chiefs believed they would help source guns to resist Afrikaner trekkers from south and to prevent other nations from taking power in the region. The BaNgwato and BaNgwaketse tribes were the first to wholly adopt Christianity in the 1890s and 1900s, and their respective chiefs banned several tribal practices that contradicted Christian teachings.

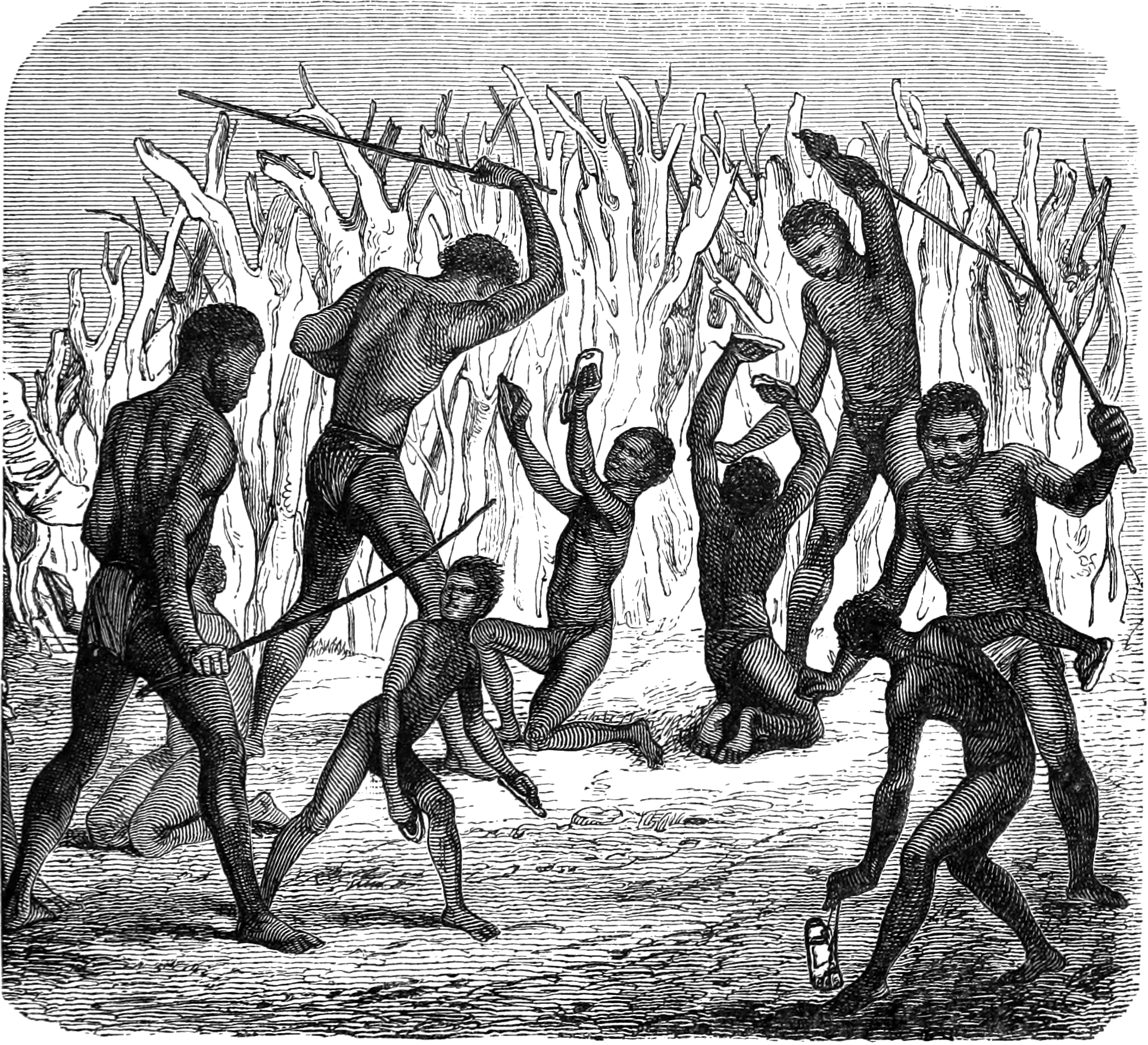
Beating boys as a part of the Bogwera ceremony (1870s)

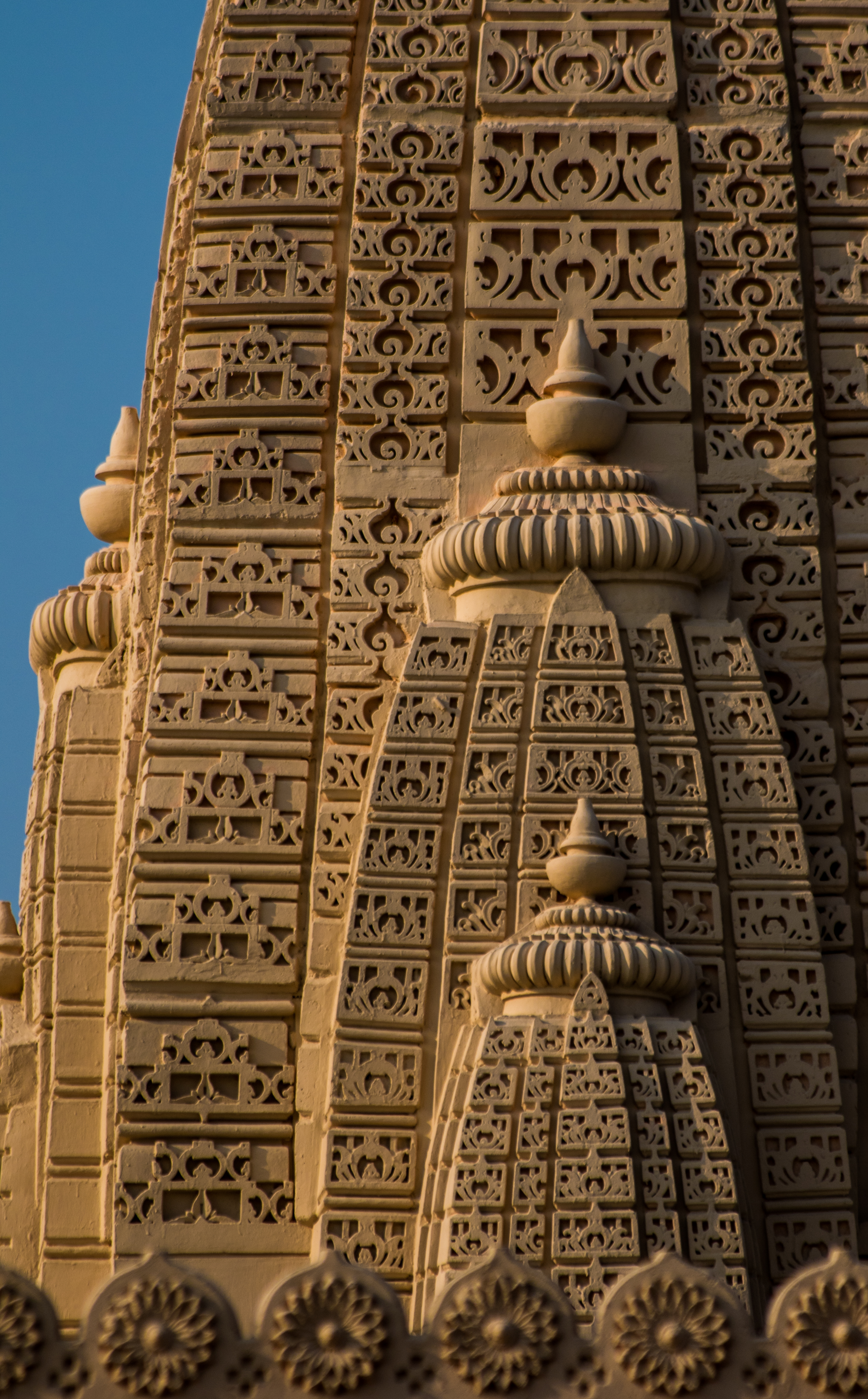
BAPS Swaminarayan Hindu Mission, Gaborone.

After the arrival of Christianity in Botswana, the missionaries established Bible schools and attempted to end old practices such as Bogwera (the tribe's traditional initiation ceremony into manhood) and Bojale (a girl's initiation ceremony into womanhood after she reached puberty), both of which were traditionally linked to the social acceptance of someone's readiness to marry as well the right to inherit property. These practices continued to exist in private, despite missionary efforts to end them. The Christian missionaries were politically involved as interpreters between the tribal chiefs and the colonial administrators.

After Botswana gained independence in 1966 from the colonial rule, senior Christian mission officials and priests served as the first Speaker of the National Assembly and as officials in the new government. In 1970s, its new leaders reviewed the Christian colonial curriculum in schools, and revised it in order to restore traditional values based on pre-Christian religious ideas, such as Kagisanyo and Botho, respectively harmony and humanism. Bogwera and Bojale were re-introduced. The new leaders also adopted a policy of religious tolerance and freedom, an approach towards religion that continues in Botswana in the 21st century. However, the school curriculum remains largely as before, with Christian terminology and ideologies.

== Demographics ==
The 2022 census detailed results have been presented on the Statistics Botswana official media channels broken down by various demographics. Data on Fertility, Mortality, Migration and Religion was presented on 11-12 June 2024. According to Census 2022, 86.5% of the population is Christian (79.3% in 2011), 7.1% have no religion (15.3% in 2011), 4.6% follow African traditional religions (4.1% in 2011), 0.6% are Muslim (0.6% in 2011) and 0.2% are Hindu (0.3% in 2011).

Religion in Botswana
Religion	Census year		
Religion	2001	2011	2022
Christianity	71.6%	79.3%	86.5%
No religion	20.6%	15.3%	7.1%
Badimo	6.0%	4.1%	4.6%
Islam	0.4%	0.6%	0.6%
Hinduism	0.3%	0.3%	0.2%
Rastafari	–	0.1%	0.2%
Bahai	0.06%	0.1%	0%
Other	1%	0.1%	0.8%

== Religions ==
=== Baháʼí Faith ===
As of 2001, there were approximately 700 members of the Baháʼí Faith in Botswana.

=== Christianity ===
Christianity is the majority religion in Botswana. According to the country’s 2011 census, 79% of the population are members of Christian groups. Christian churches in Botswana include the mainline churches created by missionaries, African-initiated churches created independently by Batswana, and Evangelical and Pentecostal churches.

Christian missionaries first arrived in Botswana in 1812, and Christianity was widely adopted during the colonial period of the Bechuanaland Protectorate.

Botswana recognises only Christian holidays as public holidays. The nationwide religious observations include Good Friday, Easter Monday, Ascension Day, and Christmas.

=== Hinduism ===
Hinduism is a minority religion practised by 0.3% of the population of Botswana. As of January 2016, there are five Hindu temples in Botswana, including the Sai Temple and ISKCON Temple in Gaborone.

=== Islam ===
Islam is a minority religion in Botswana. It first came to the country through Muslim immigrants from South Asia in the late 1800's, who settled in the area during the British colonial rule. The first mosque in the country, the Lobatse Mosque, was built in Lobatse in 1967. According to the 2022 census, there are around 9,278 Muslims in Botswana,.

There are currently 20 mosques in Botswana according to the Botswana Muslim Association.

The Shia population in Botswana is estimated between one and three percent of the total Muslim population of Botswana; according to Pew Forum it is less than one percent while as per Ahl al-Bayt World Assembly the population of Shia in Botswana is around two percent of the total Muslim population of Botswana.

Indian Muslims were the first Islamic populations in Botswana when they arrived around the 1890s. These Indian Muslims were limited to urban areas by the colonial authorities. Within some brief time, Muslims established Islamic centres throughout one urban centre to another as cities and Muslim populations increased.

Malawian Muslims began to appear around the 1950s in Francistown. They arrived mainly for job opportunities like mining.

There were very few conversions to Islam until the 1970s. Shaykh Ali Mustapha of Guyana has proselytised in Botswana since the 1970s, where missions are concentrated in townships and prisons.

Gaborone is considered the main heart of Botswana's muslim community with a modernised mosque being built in 1982. The first mosque in the country being Lobatse Mosque in 19

=== Judaism ===
The history of the Jews in Botswana is relatively modern and centred in the city of Gaborone. Most Jews in Botswana are Israelis and South Africans.

Only about 100 Jews lived in Botswana during the 2000s, with almost all living in Gaborone. The community was predominantly Jewish Israelis working in agriculture, business, and industry. No synagogues exist in Botswana. The South African Jewish Board of Deputies provides rabbis for the community during the High Holidays. Services are typically held at Jewish homes or at communal centres. Jews in Botswana are buried in non-Jewish cemeteries, as there is no Jewish cemetery in the country. Kosher food is imported from South Africa.

Botswana's Jewish community is one of the youngest Jewish communities in Africa. The community is represented by the Jewish Community of Botswana (JCB), the Botswanan affiliate of the African Jewish Congress and the World Jewish Congress.

=== Traditional African religions ===
Traditional African religions in Botswana include Badimo and Modimo.

== Irreligion ==
Irreligion is not uncommon among Botswana. Though Christianity predominates, according to 2011 census results, 15% of the country did not identify with any religion.

== Freedom of religion ==
The constitution of Botswana protects the freedom of religion and allows missionaries and proselytisers to work freely after they register with the government, but forced conversion is against the law. There is no state religion in Botswana.

In 2023, the country was scored 4 out of 4 for religious freedom.

== See also ==
- Botswana Council of Churches
- List of Catholic dioceses in South Africa, Botswana and Swaziland
- Public holidays in Botswana
