= Bhudaza Mapefane =

Lesotho jazz musician

- Born: Bhudaza Mapefane; 23 September 1961 (age 64)
- Origin: Lesotho
- Genres: jazz
- Occupation: Singer

Bhudaza Mapefane (born 23 September 1961) is a Lesotho-born jazz musician and pianist.

== Early life ==
Bhudaza was born in Hlotse, Mankoaneng in the Leribe District, Lesotho. His appreciation for jazz music started at a young age while listening to his father's large jazz collection. At the age of 21, he met Mark Gorman, who was an economist at the Lesotho National Development Corporation. He gave him his first piano lessons at Victoria Hotel. In 1985 Bhudaza explored his skills by doing his first professional performance at Victoria Hotel and Maseru Casino Hotel with Jazz Combo,a quintet made up of David Mochoko Mapefane (his late older brother and mentor), Peter Rakhomo, Tau Malebo and Mpho Manoto.

In 1987 he enrolled at Mmabana Cultural Centre in Mmabatho, North West, to further his jazz piano lessons under the Molobye brothers—Peter and Labane. Here, in 1988, he received saxophone lessons from American reedman, Rene McLean. After graduating in 1989, Bhudaza then joined Sankomota as a pianist, where subsequently switched to a saxophone.

== Career ==
Sankomota was composed of musicians such as Tsepo Tshola and guitarist/bandleader Frank Moki Leepa. He performed at Unity 91 Homecoming Concert which was headed by Caiphus Semenya and organized for the exiled artists. In 1992, after Tsepo Tshola parted ways with Frank Leepa, Bhudaza joined The Village Pope and in 1994 they recorded and released an album titled Let's Hold Hands. In the same year, he joined Lucky Dube, with whom he toured Namibia, South Africa, The Comoros Islands, and Uganda. After six months with the reggae star, Bhudaza formed a band called Corner Stone Jazz. In 1995 and 1996 it was the resident band at Lesotho Sun Hotel.

Bhudaza enrolled at the Federated Union of Black Artists (FUBA) for a jazz course. Between 1997 and 2000 he studied jazz at the University of Cape Town. His activity during this time included playing and touring with the Sunshine Band, the most popular ensemble in the region at the time, boasting gifted musicians such as drummer Phillip Meintjies. After graduating with a diploma in jazz studies he was called in to join Talima Jazz Band, which formed part King Letsie III's entourage to Germany's Hanover Expo in 2000. The following year he formed Bhudaza & Friends and went solo in 2003 to record his debut album, Bo-Mapefane.

Produced by Frank Leepa, it was released in South Africa under Universal Music Group and immediately achieved multi-platinum status. His successive albums were also very successful in terms of sales and accolades. His third album, Likhomo scooped a SAMA (award) in the best adult contemporary album in 2010. He was named the Vodacom Superstar Music Dance Competition 2012 Icon; this meant that he coached and trained aspiring musicians in Lesotho. He was awarded an honorary award by the Ultimate Radio Music Awards for flying the Afro jazz flag high in the music industry globally.

== Awards ==
- South African Music Awards Best adult contemporary album 2010.
- Vodacom Superstar Music Dance Competition 2012.
- Ultimate Radio Music Awards.

== Discography ==
- Bo-Mapefane (Universal, 2003).
- Mohokare (Universal, 2006).
- Likhomo (Universal, 2009).
