= Thabo Makhetha-Kwinana =

South African fashion designer (born 1987)

Thabo Makhetha – Kwinana
- Born: 21 September 1987 (age 38); Lesotho
- Occupations: Fashion designer; Award-winning fashion designer; Businesswoman; Philanthropist
- Years active: 2009–present
- Website: www.thabomakhetha.com

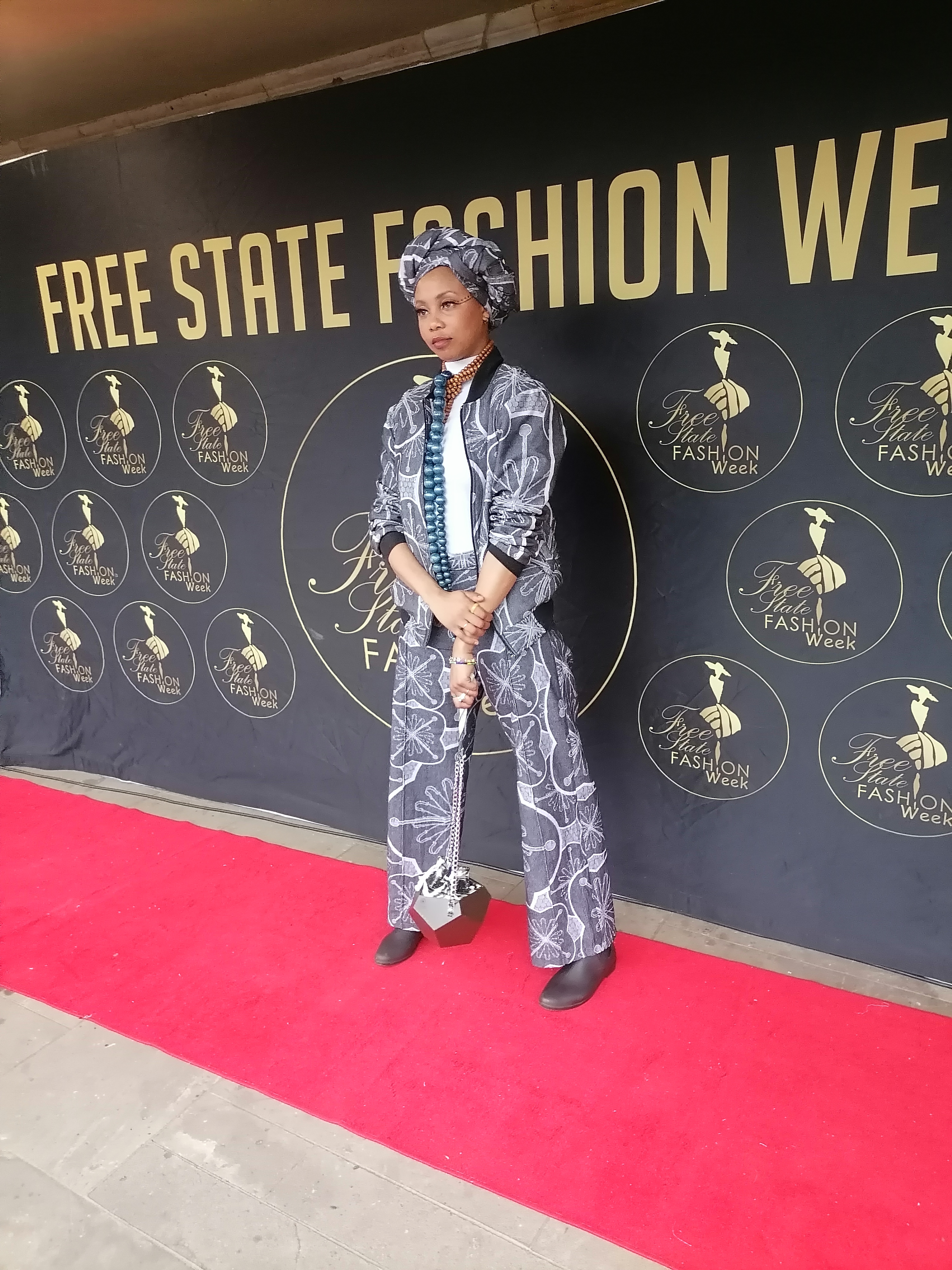
Thabo Makhetha - Kwinana at the Free State Fashion Week 2024

Thabo Makhetha-Kwinana (21 September 1987) is a fashion designer known for her designs which fuse African and Western styles, with a focus on Basotho culture.

== Early life and education ==
Thabo Makhetha-Kwinana was born in Lesotho, but moved to South Africa when she was three years old and has since lived there. She has lived in Mahikeng, Johannesburg, Pietermaritzburg, as well as Port Elizabeth, and currently resides in Cape Town, Western Cape province of South Africa. Thabo Makhetha studied at the Nelson Mandela Metropolitan University in Port Elizabeth where she graduated with a National Diploma in Fashion.

== Career and Thabo Makhetha Fashion label ==
In 2009, she founded her self-named brand at the age of 21, inspired by her grandmother, who was a seamstress. It was her mother who saw her talent at an early age and went further to purchase her first sewing machine. Her designs are inspired by her Basotho heritage, with a particular focus on the traditional Basotho blanket, which she incorporates into her clothing designs. She is also known for her use of vibrant African prints and patterns.

Thabo Makhetha made her runway debut in 2014 at Vancouver Fashion Week in Canada, where she was praised for the quality and creativity of her work for the Kobo ea Bohali "Blanket of Prestige" collection. In 2014, Makhetha-Kwinana was honored with the 2014 Impact Award. In 2015, she showcased at South Africa Fashion Week and has since showcased in Lesotho, the United Kingdom, and Milan, Johannesburg, and the United States of America. In 2016 then editor of Elle Magazine nominated Thabo's starburst coat for Most Beautiful Object in South Africa. She has been honoured by The Nelson Mandela Chambers as one of the Top 40 Under 40 Achievers of 2014, and included in the Mail & Guardian's Top 200 Young South Africans in 2017. In 2020, she was featured on Black Parade, a Platform by US Superstar Beyonce to showcase Africa's top designers. She has been featured in various publications, including Vogue, Elle, and Marie Claire. In 2017, Louis Vuitton caused headlines by producing a men's collection using a similar print as a Basotho blanket, a controversial move that sparked accusations of cultural appropriation.

Thabo Makhetha-Kwinana took part in the artist-in-residence programme of the exhibition: “Breaking Down the Walls" – 150 years of collecting at Iziko South African Museum, which commemorated Africa Day on 25 May 2023.

In October 2023, in honour of CTM's 40th birthday, Thabo Makhetha-Kwinana collaborated with CTM, South Africa's leading tile retailer, to launch a limited edition tile collection. In 2024, Thabo Makhetha collaborated with the South African shoes company Veldskoen Shoes at the South African Fashion Week to celebrate rich South African heritage.

== Awards and accomplishments ==
- Impact Award for Design Excellence - 2014.
- Named Top 40 under Nelson Mandela Bay Chamber of Commerce 40 under 40 in 2014.
- Elle Magazine nominated the Kobo Starburst Coat for the Most Beautiful Object in South Africa - 2016.
- Mail & Guardian in Top 200 Young South Africans - 2017
- Mandela Washington Fellowship (MWF) Alumni 2018.
