= Nana Coyote =

- Birth name: Tsietsi Daniel Motijoane
- Born: August 17, 1955; Lesotho
- Origin: Lesotho
- Died: July 5, 2010 (aged 55); Johannesburg, South Africa
- Genres: Mbaqanga, Soul, Pop, R&B, Jazz
- Occupation: Singer-songwriter
- Instrument: Vocals
- Years active: 1975–2010
- Labels: Wild Dog Music

Tsietsi Daniel Motijoane, better known as Nana Coyote, was a Lesotho born South African musician. Motijoane grew up in Sharpeville, in what is known as the Vaal Triangle. He started singing at an early age and had formed a band by the time he was in high school.

One of his early recordings was an album titled Current in 1986 which had hit songs such as Current Uyayinova and Don't You Wanna Know Me, The following year (1987) released Who's Lord In The House, Save The World (1988) which was followed by Vuku Zenzele (1989) He performed and featured in album recordings, mostly as a featured artist with groups like Stimela and Sankomota, Started out at a local band called The Black Five in Sharpeville in 1975 where he was the lead singer, Throughout his career he worked with a number of bands, at times as a featured artist, and in some cases as a band member.

Coyote released his solo album titled “Majaja” on the 1st of August 2003. In 2004, Nana Coyote, Steve Kekana and Joe Nina recorded a studio album as The Trio titled "My Pride, My Joy". The album also featured Tsepo Tshola and Hugh Masekela.

He also lent his voice to a number of musical projects, including "Party Time" by Moses Khumalo in 2005 and "Ke Nako" by Nutty Nys.

Nana Coyote died in 2010 after illness. He was posthumously honoured with a SAMA Lifetime Achievement Award in 2016 at the South African Music Awards.

== Awards and honours ==
Period	Honour / Award
2016	SAMA Lifetime Achievement Award (SAMA 22)

== Discography ==
=== Albums ===
Year	Title	Label (original issue)
1986	Current	Gallo Record Company
1987	Who's The Lord In The House	Gallo Record Company
1988	Save The World	Gallo Record Company
1989	Vuku Zenzele	Hot Stuff
2003	Majaja	Kisanji Entertainment / Sheer Sounds
2007	Mo Fe (Second Time Around)	Khula Records
2012	I Am Not A Musicians, I Am Music	The Music Industry cc

=== Compilations ===
Year	Title	Label (original issue)
2001	Best Of The Best	Gallo Record Company

=== Singles and EPs ===
Year	Title	Label (original issue)
1986	Current (Uyayinova) (Backed by Stimela)	Gallo Record Company
1988	Cosmic Man	Gallo Record Company
1988	Save The World (Duet With Benjamin Dube)	Gallo Record Company
1989	Namibia 435	Teal Records

=== As part of a band ===
Year	Title	Band	Label (original issue)
2004	My Pride, My Joy	The Trio	Kisanji Entertainment / Sheer Sounds

=== As featured artist ===
Year	Title	Album	Album Artist	Label (original issue)
1986	Take Your Love	Love Triangle	Steve Kekana	Gallo Record Company
1986	Whispers in the Deep	Look, Listen and Decide	Stimela	Gallo Record Company
1996	Hola	Cool As Hell	Alaska	Universal Records
2005	Party Time	Ibuyile	Moses Khumalo	Sheer Sounds
