= Sotho people =

Bantu ethnic group

Basotho
- Flag of Lesotho

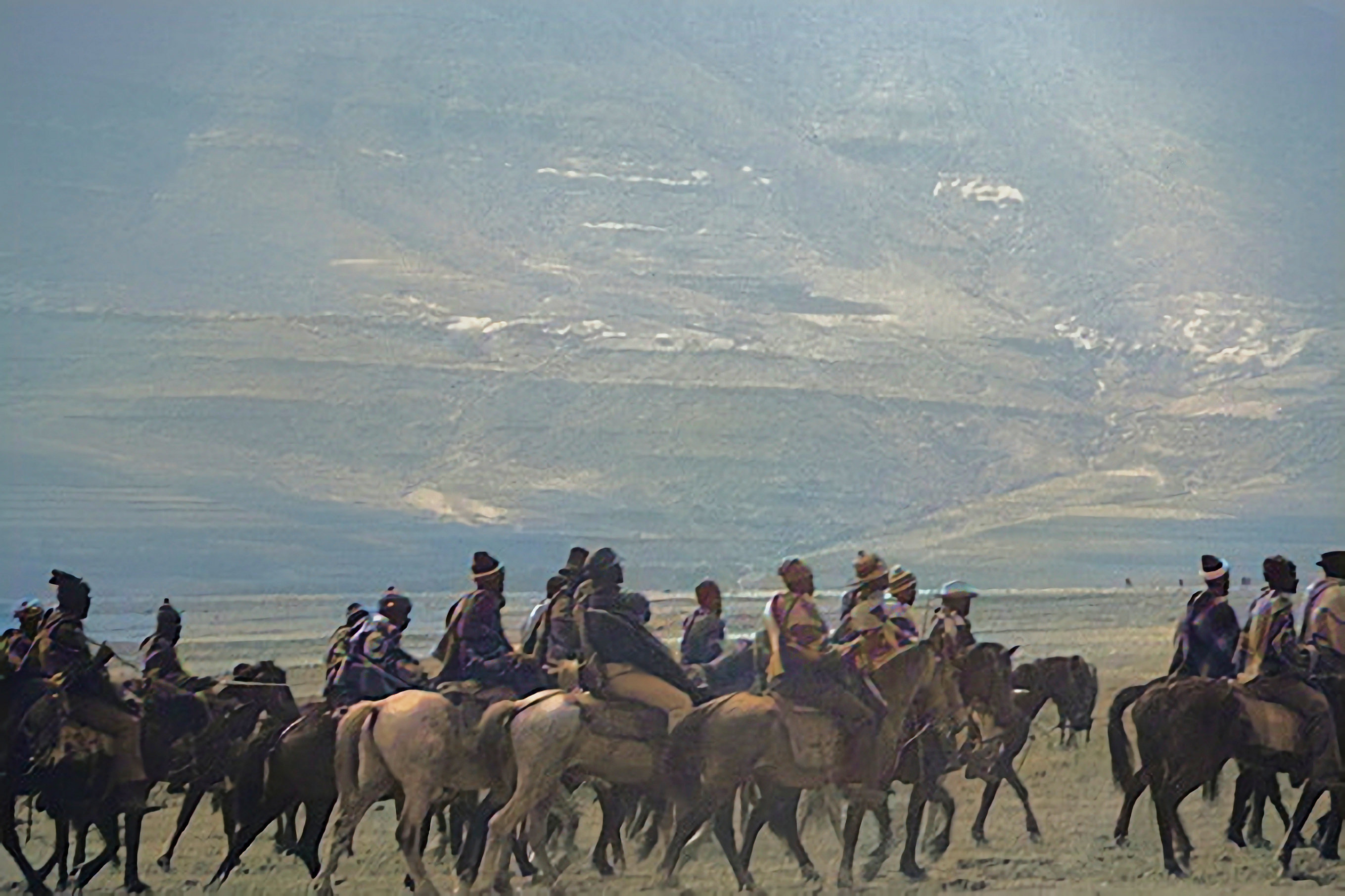
- Basotho horsemen

Total population
- c. 7,254,315 (2023 est.)

Regions with significant populations
- South Africa: 5,103,205
- Lesotho: 2,130,110
- Botswana: 11,000
- Eswatini: 6,000
- Namibia: 4,000

Languages
- Sotho language IsiXhosa, IsiZulu, English, Afrikaans

Religion
- Christianity, Modimo

Related ethnic groups
- Pedi people, Tswana people and Lozi people, San people, Phuthi people, Thembu people

Sotho
- Person: Mosotho
- People: Basotho
- Language: Sesotho
- Country: Lesotho

The Basotho (/bæˈsuːtuː/), also known as the Sotho (/ˈsuːtuː/), are a Sotho-Tswana ethnic group indigenous to Southern Africa. They primarily inhabit the regions of Lesotho, South Africa, Botswana and Namibia.

The ancestors of the Sotho people are believed to have originated from Northeast Africa, and migrated south in the fifth century AD. The Sotho people have split into different clans over time as a result of the Mfecane (a series of wars and migrations that took place in the 19th century) and colonialism.

The British and the Boers (Dutch descendants) divided Sotho land amongst themselves in the late 19th century. Lesotho was created by the settlers in the 1869 Convention of Aliwal North following the conflict over land with Moshoeshoe I, the king of the Southern Sothos.

The Southern Sotho of Lesotho's identity emerged from the creation of Lesotho by the British after the Boers defeated Moshoeshoe I in the Third Basotho War in 1868 and he asked the British for protection. Some of the Southern Sotho speakers who were not part of Moshoeshoe's kingdom when he united some of their tribesmen are living in Gauteng, while some are found in the west of KwaZulu-Natal, the north of the Eastern Cape and most of the Free State province.

== History ==
=== Early history ===
The Basotho nation is a mixture of Bantu-speaking clans that mixed with San people who already lived in Southern Africa when they arrived there. Bantu-speaking people had settled in what is now South Africa by about 1500 CE. Separation from the Batswana is assumed to have taken place by the 14th century. Some Basotho people split from the Nguni while others got assimilated into building the Nguni nation. By the 16th century, Iron-working was well established in Basotho communities alongside their Nguni neighbours. Basotho were mostly independent and relatively isolated up until this point in which they occasionally traded with the regions north of their homeland with external links that are described as "Sporadic and Marginal". By at least the 17th century a series of Basotho kingdoms covered the southern portion of the African plateau (nowadays Free State Province and parts of Gauteng), and North West. Basotho society was highly decentralized, and organized on the basis of kraals, or extended clans, each of which was ruled by its own chief. Chiefdoms were united into loose confederations.

=== 19th century ===
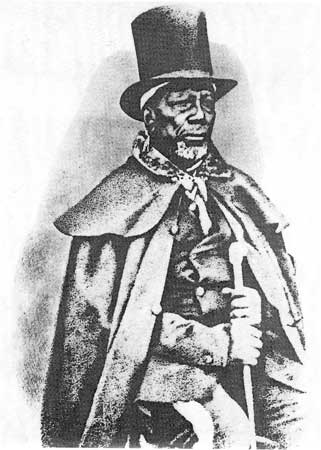
King Moshoeshoe.

In the 1820s, refugees from the Zulu expansion under Shaka came into contact with the Basotho people residing on the highveld. In 1823, pressure caused one group of Basotho, the Kololo, to migrate north. They moved past the Okavango Swamp and across the Zambezi into Barotseland, (which is now part of Zambia, Angola, Zimbabwe, Botswana, and Namibia). In 1845, the Kololo conquered Barotseland.

At about the same time, the Boers began to encroach upon Basotho territory. After the Cape Colony was ceded to Britain at the conclusion of the Napoleonic Wars, many farmers opted to leave the former Dutch colony in the Great Trek. They moved inland, where they eventually established independent polities.

At the time of these developments, Moshoeshoe I skillfully and systematically unified a loose confederacy of Basotho clans and Nguni tribes that had settled there into what would become a modern state of Lesotho in the southern highveld. Universally praised as a skilled diplomat and strategist, he molded the disparate refugee groups escaping the Difaqane into a cohesive nation. His leadership allowed smaller Basotho clans who neighboured him to seek his protection allowing the small nation to survive the obstacles that destroyed other indigenous South African kingdoms during the 19th century, such as the Zulu Mfecane, the inward expansion of the voortrekkers and the plans of the Colonial Office.

In 1822, Moshoeshoe established the capital at Butha-Buthe, an easily defensible mountain in the northern Drakensberg mountain range, thus laying the foundations of the eventual Kingdom of Lesotho. His capital was later moved to Thaba Bosiu.

To deal with the encroaching voortrekker groups, Moshoeshoe encouraged French missionary activity in his kingdom. Missionaries sent by the Paris Evangelical Missionary Society provided the King with foreign affairs counsel and helped to facilitate the purchase of modern weapons.

Aside from acting as state ministers, missionaries (primarily Casalis and Arbousset) played a vital role in delineating Sesotho orthography and printing Sesotho language materials between 1837 and 1855. The first Sesotho translation of the Bible appeared in 1878.

In 1868, after losing the western lowlands to the Boers during the Free State–Basotho Wars, Moshoeshoe successfully appealed to Queen Victoria to proclaim Basutoland (modern Lesotho) a protectorate of Britain. Accordingly, the British administration was established in Maseru, the site of Lesotho's current capital. Local chieftains retained power over internal affairs, while Britain was responsible for foreign affairs and the defense of the protectorate.

In 1869, the British sponsored a process to demarcate the borders of Basutoland. While many clans had territory within Basutoland, large numbers of Sesotho speakers resided in areas allocated to the Orange Free State, the sovereign voortrekker republic that bordered the Basotho kingdom. King Moshoeshoe died two years later in 1870, after the end of war, and was buried at the summit of Thaba Bosiu.

=== 20th century ===
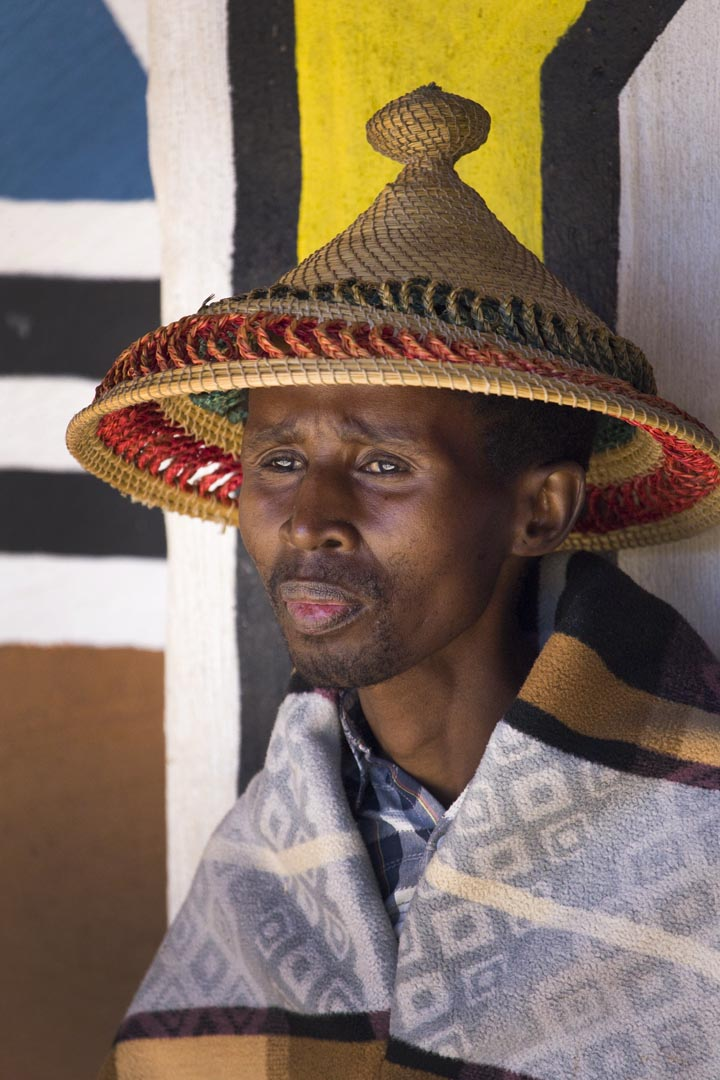
A Mosotho man wearing a modianywe

Britain's protection ensured that repeated attempts by the Orange Free State, and later the Republic of South Africa, to absorb part or all of Basutoland were unsuccessful. In 1966, Basutoland gained its independence from Britain, becoming the Kingdom of Lesotho.

Sesotho is widely spoken throughout the subcontinent due to internal migration. To enter the cash economy, Lesotho men often migrated to large cities in South Africa to find employment in the mining industry. Migrant workers from the Free State and Lesotho thus helped spread Sesotho to the urban areas of South Africa. It is generally agreed that migrant work harmed the family life of most Sesotho speakers because adults (primarily men) were required to leave their families behind in impoverished communities while they were employed in distant cities.

Attempts by the apartheid government to force Sesotho speakers to relocate to designated homelands had little effect on their settlement patterns. Large numbers of workers continued to leave the traditional areas of black settlement. Women gravitated towards employment as agricultural or domestic workers while men typically found employment in the mining sector.

In terms of religion, the central role that Christian missionaries played in helping Moshoeshoe I secure his kingdom helped to ensure widespread Basotho conversion to Christianity. Today, the bulk of Sesotho speakers practice a form of Christianity that blends elements of traditional Christian dogma with local, pre-Western beliefs. Modimo ("God") is viewed as a supreme being who cannot be approached by mortals. Ancestors are seen as intercessors between Modimo and the living, and their favor must be cultivated through worship and reverence. Officially, the majority of Lesotho's population is Catholic. The Southern Basotho's heartland is the Free State province in South Africa and neighboring Lesotho. Both of these largely rural areas have widespread poverty and underdevelopment. Many Sesotho speakers live in conditions of economic hardship, but people with access to land and steady employment may enjoy a higher standard of living. Landowners often participate in subsistence or small-scale commercial farming ventures. However, overgrazing and land mismanagement are growing problems.

== Demographics ==
Black people born in Lesotho and other Basotho heartlands have continued to participate in circular migration to South Africa in search of work, while maintaining ties with their homes in rural areas. Generally, employment patterns among the Basotho follow the same patterns as broader South African society. Historical factors cause unemployment among the Basotho and other Black South Africans to remain high.

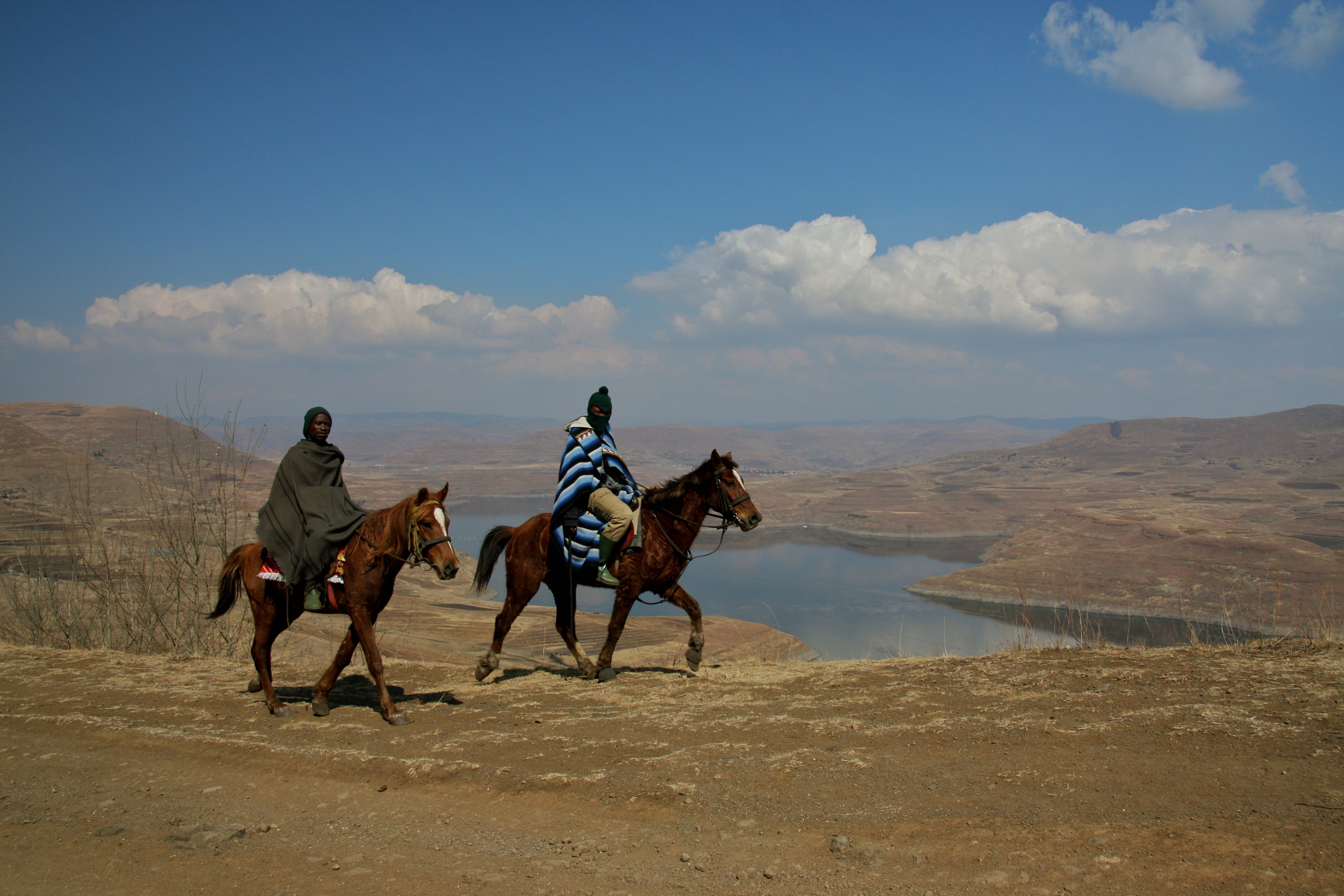
Basotho on Horses

Percent of Sesotho speakers across South Africa:

- Gauteng Province: 13.1%
- Atteridgeville: 12.3%
- City of Johannesburg Metropolitan Municipality: 9.6%
- Soweto: 15.5%
- Ekurhuleni Metropolitan Municipality: 10.0%
- Katlehong: 22.4%
- Sedibeng District Municipality: 46.7%
- West Rand District Municipality: 10.8%
- Midvaal Local Municipality: 27.9%
- Free State Province: 64.2%
- Bloemfontein: 33.4%

== Language ==
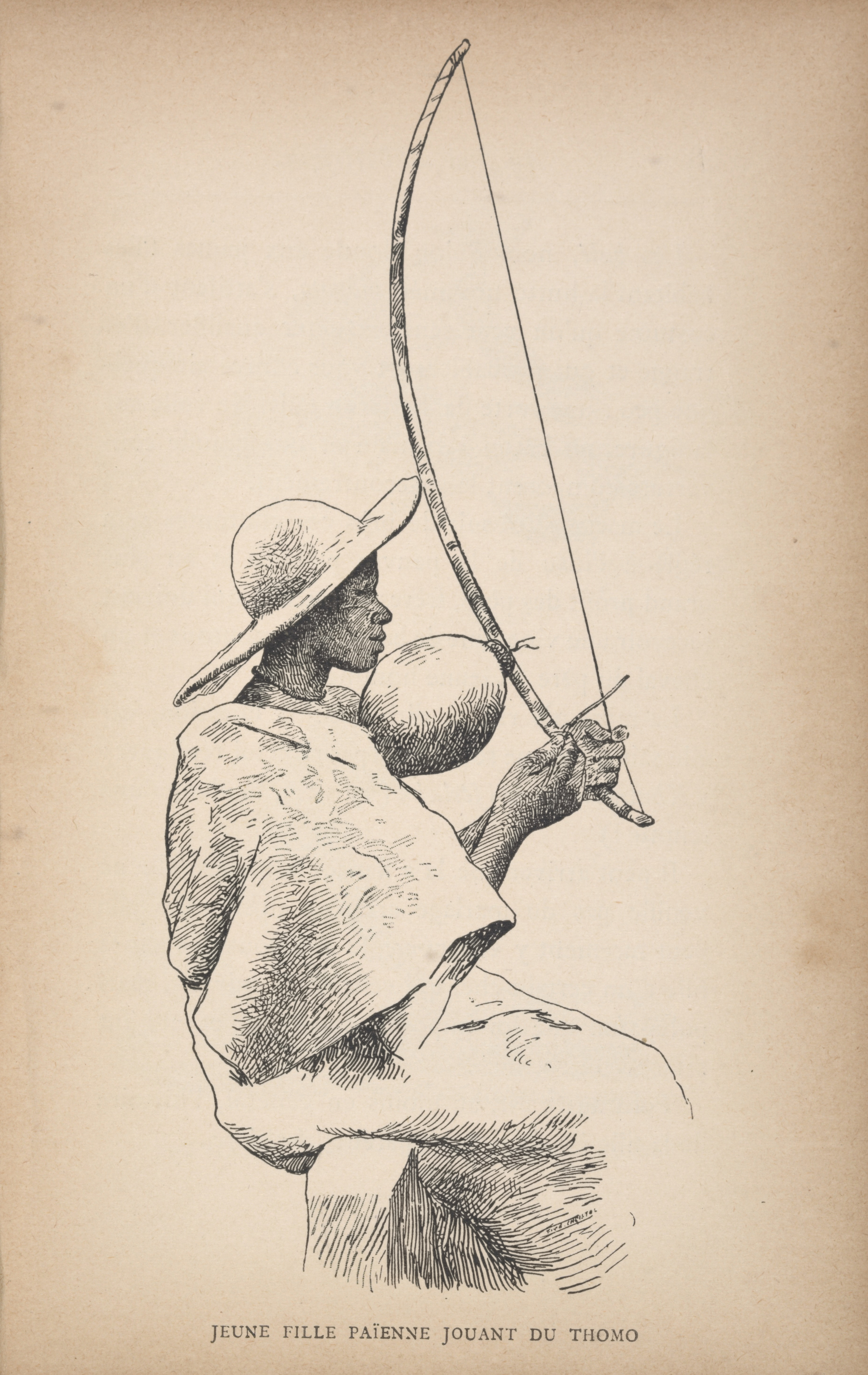
The Uhadi musical bow or thomo musical bow used by the Sotho people, circa 1897.

The language of the Basotho is referred to as Sesotho, less commonly known as Sesotho sa borwa. Some texts may refer to Sesotho as "Southern Sotho" to differentiate it from Northern Sotho, also called Sepedi.

Sesotho is the first language of 1.5 million people in Lesotho, or 85% of the population. It is one of the two official languages in Lesotho, the other being English. Lesotho enjoys one of Africa's highest literacy rates, with 59% of the adult population being literate, chiefly in Sesotho.

Sesotho is one of the eleven official languages of South Africa. According to the 2011 South African National Census of 2011, almost 4 million people speak Sesotho as their first language, including 62% of Free State inhabitants. Approximately 13.1% of the residents of Gauteng speak Sesotho as their first language. In the North West Province, 5% of the population speaks Sesotho as a first language, with a concentration of speakers in the Maboloka region. Three percent of Mpumalanga's people speak Sesotho as their first language, with many speakers living in the Standerton area. Two percent of the residents of the Eastern Cape speak Sesotho as a first language, though they are located mostly in the northern part of the province.

Aside from Lesotho and South Africa, 60,000 people speak Silozi (a close relative of Sesotho) in Zambia. Additionally, a few Sesotho speakers reside in Botswana, Eswatini and the Caprivi Strip of Namibia. No official statistics on second language usage are available, but one conservative estimate of the number of people who speak Sesotho as a second (or later) language is 5.9 million.

Sesotho is used in a range of educational settings, both as a subject of study and as a medium of instruction. It is used in its spoken and written forms in all spheres of education, from preschool to doctoral studies. However, the number of technical materials (e.g., in the fields of commerce, information technology, law, science, and math) in the language is still relatively small.

Sesotho has developed a sizable media presence since the end of apartheid. Lesedi FM is a 24-hour Sesotho radio station run by the South African Broadcasting Corporation (SABC), broadcasting solely in Sesotho. There are other regional radio stations throughout Lesotho and the Free State. Half-hour Sesotho news bulletins are broadcast daily on the SABC free-to-air channel SABC 2. Independent TV broadcaster eTV also features a daily half-hour Sesotho bulletin. Both SABC and the eTV group produce a range of programs that feature some Sesotho dialogue.

In Lesotho, the Lesotho National Broadcasting Service broadcasts to South Africa via satellite pay-TV provider, DStv.

Most newspapers in Lesotho are written in Sesotho or both Sesotho and English. There are no fully fledged South African newspapers in Sesotho except for regional newsletters in QwaQwa, Fouriesburg, Ficksburg, and possibly other Free State towns.

Currently, the mainstream South African magazine Bona includes Sesotho content. Since the codification of Sesotho orthography, literary works have been produced in Sesotho. Notable Sesotho-language literature includes Thomas Mofolo's epic Chaka, which has been translated into several languages, including English and German.

== Clothing ==
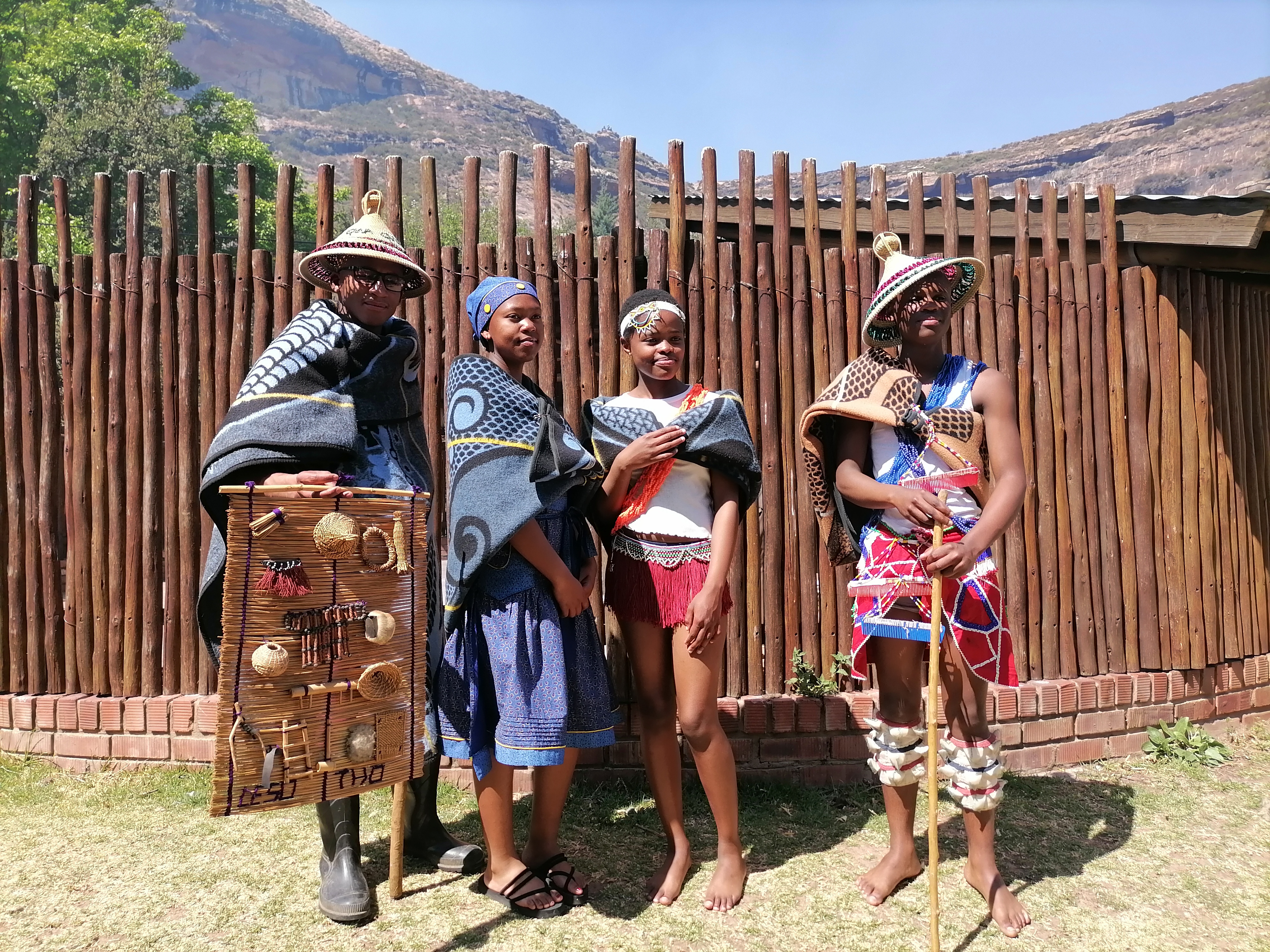
Basotho in their traditional wear

The Basotho have a unique traditional attire. This includes the mokorotlo, a conical hat with a decorated knob at the top that is worn differently for men and women. The Basotho blanket is often worn over the shoulders or waist and protects the wearer against the cold. Although many Sotho people wear westernized clothing, often traditional garments are worn over them.

=== Basotho herders ===
Many Basotho who live in rural areas wear clothing that suits their lifestyles. For instance, boys who herd cattle in the rural Free State and Lesotho wear the Basotho blanket and large rain boots (gumboots) as protection from the wet mountain terrain. Herd boys also often wear woolen balaclavas or caps year-round to protect their faces from cold temperatures and dusty winds.

=== Basotho women ===
Basotho women usually wear skirts and long dresses in bright colors and patterns, as well as the traditional blankets around the waist. On special occasions like wedding celebrations, they wear the seshweshwe, a traditional Basotho dress. The local traditional dresses are made using colored cloth and ribbon accents bordering each layer. Sotho women often purchase this material and have it designed in a style similar to West and East African dresses. Women often wrap a long print cloth or a small blanket around their waist, either as a skirt or as a second garment over it. This is commonly known as a wrap, and it can be used to carry infants on their backs.

=== Special clothing items ===
Special clothing is worn for special events like initiation rites and traditional healing ceremonies.

For a Lebollo la basadi, or girl's initiation ceremony, girls wear a beaded waist wrap called a thethana that covers the waist, particularly the crotch area and part of the buttocks. They also wear gray blankets and goatskin skirts. These garments are worn by young girls and women, particularly virgins.

For a Lebollo la banna, or a boy's initiation ceremony, boys wear a loincloth called a tshea as well as colorful blankets. These traditional outfits are often combined with more modern items, like sunglasses.

Traditional Sotho healers wear the bandolier, which consists of strips and strings made of leather, sinew, or beads that form a cross on the chest. The bandolier often has pouches of potions attached to it for specific rituals or physical/spiritual protection. It is believed that the San people adopted this bandolier attire for healers during times when the Basotho and the San traded and developed ties through trade, marriage, and friendship. The San people's use of the bandolier can be seen in their rock paintings that date to the 1700s.

Sotho Cultural Clothing

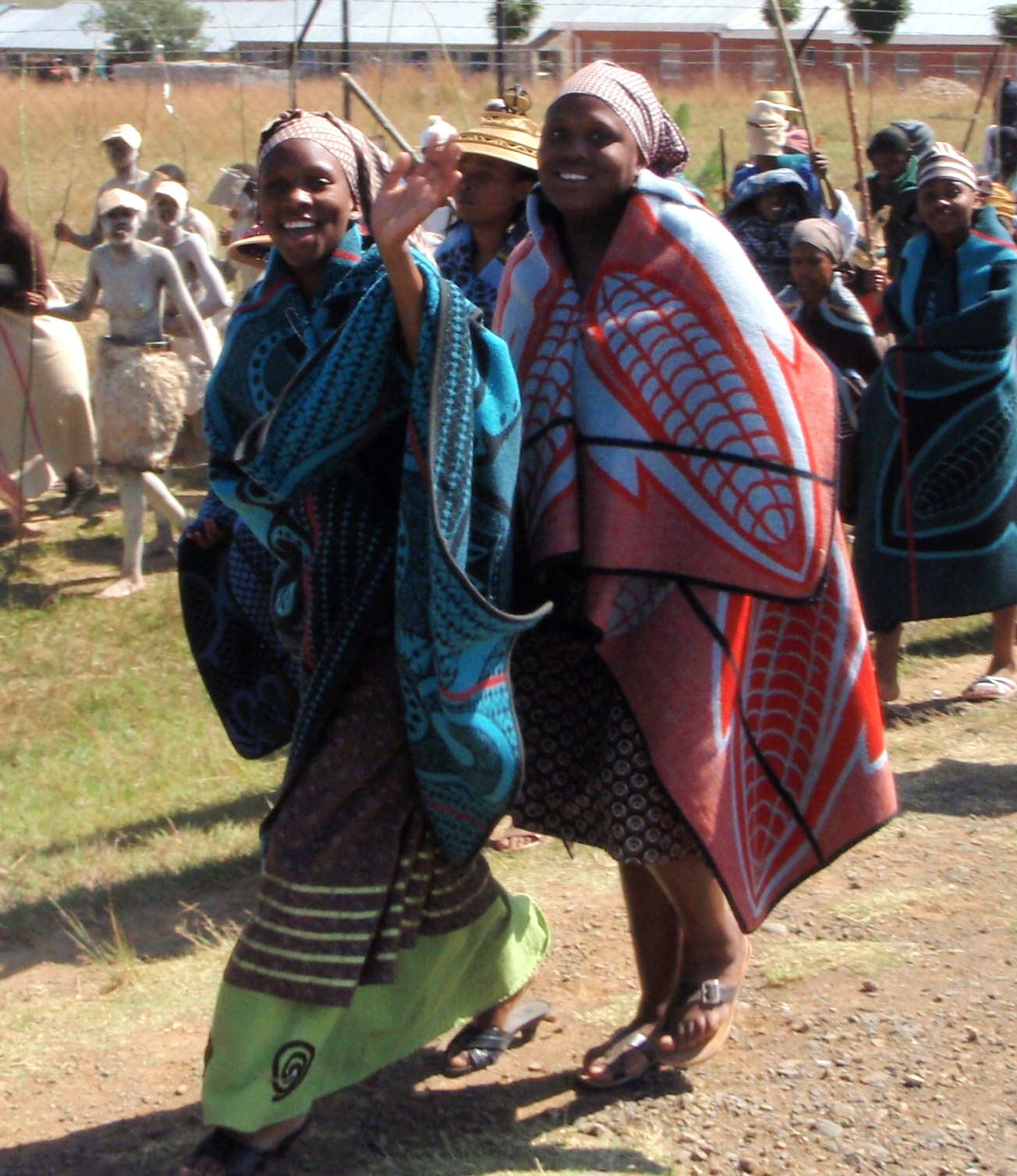
Seana Marena woollen tribal blanket traditionally

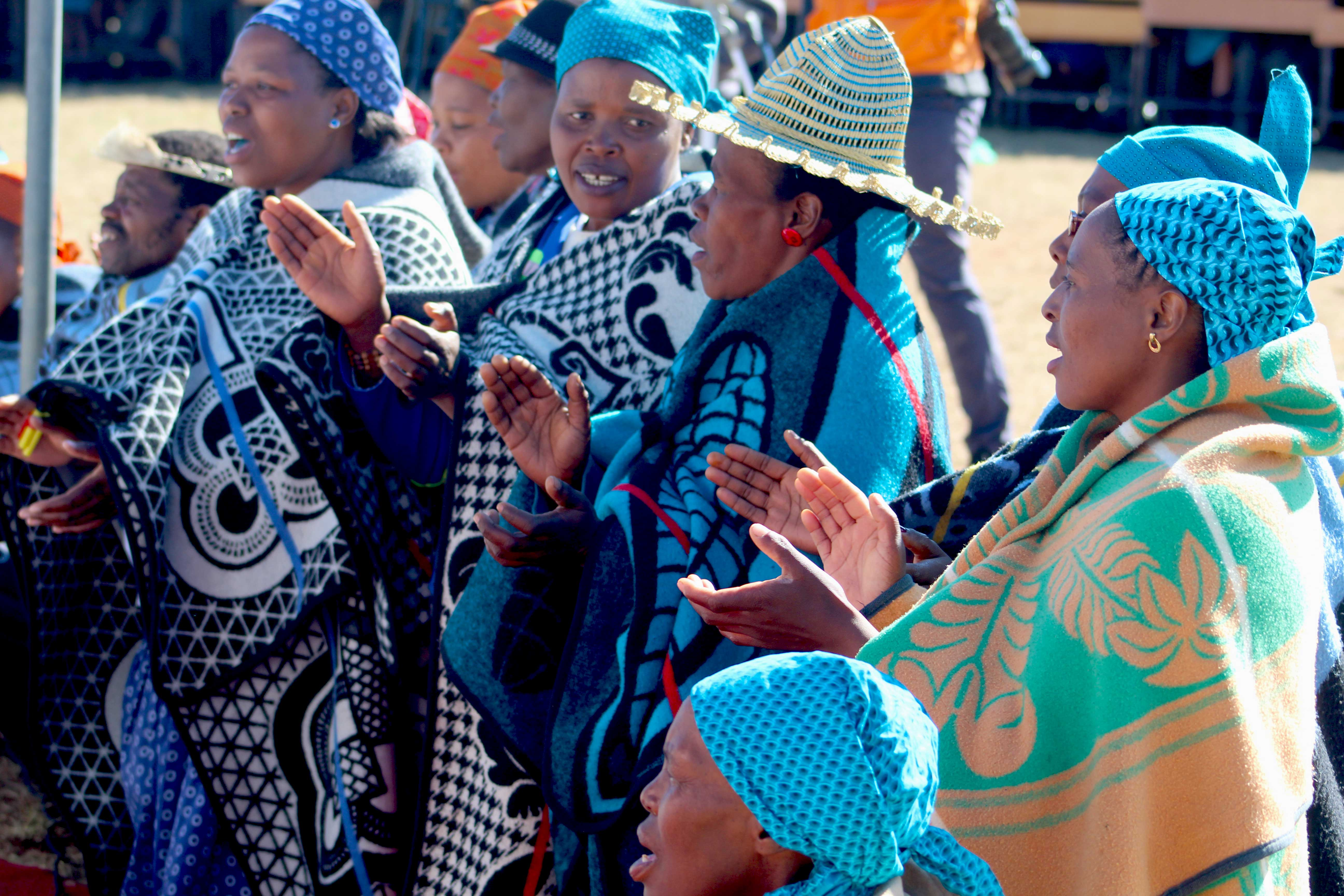
Basotho women during Mokhibo

== Culture ==
=== Sexuality ===
Adolescent Sotho herding boys have been known to explore their sexuality through maotoane, or intercrural sex.

Sexual relationships between women are described using the word motsoalle.

== Notable Sotho people ==
=== Politics and Royalty ===
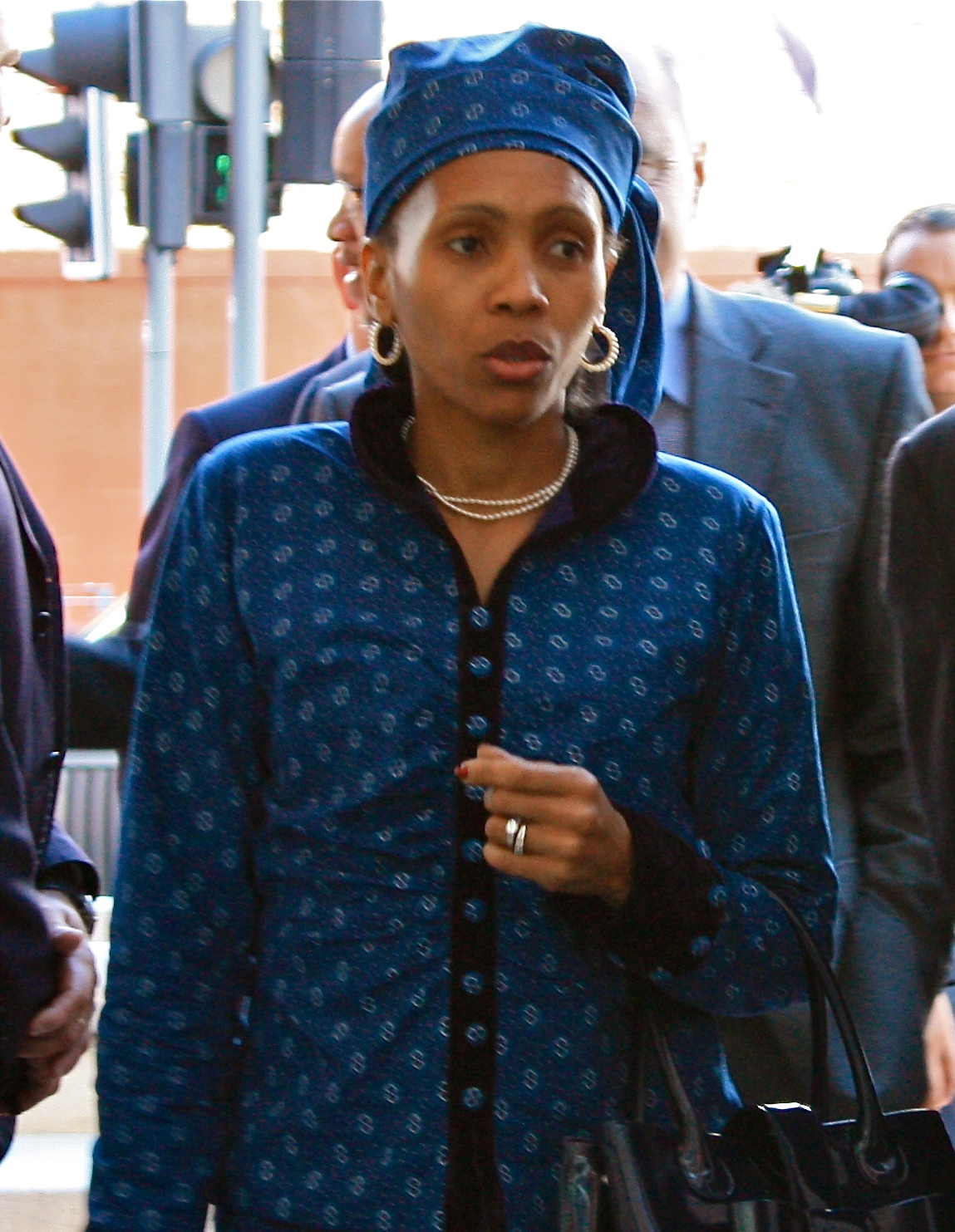
Queen 'Masenate Mohato Seeiso

- Moshoeshoe I, founder of the Basotho nation
- Moshoeshoe II, Paramount Chief of Lesotho
- Letsie III, King of Lesotho
- Queen 'Masenate Mohato Seeiso, Queen Consort of Lesotho
- Pakalitha Mosisili former prime minister of Lesotho
- Epainette Mbeki anti-apartheid activist and mother of former South African president Thabo Mbeki
- Ntsu Mokhehle former prime minister of Lesotho
- Leabua Jonathan former prime minister of Lesotho
- Mosiuoa Lekota South African anti-apartheid activist
- Hlaudi Motsoeneng South African radio personality, broadcast executive, and politician
- Limpho Hani Lesotho born activist and wife of Chris Hani
- Phumulo Masualle South African politician and former premier of Eastern Cape province
- Tsietsi Mashinini South African student activist, known for leading the 1976 Soweto Uprising against Afrikaans education
- Angie Motshekga South African politician
- Lechesa Tsenoli South African politician and former deputy Speaker of National Assembly

=== Business ===
- Phuti Mahanyele, business executive; CEO of Naspers
- Kaizer Motaung, business person; chairman of Kaizer Chiefs
- David Tlale, business person and prominent fashion designer
- Sam Motsuenyane Entrepreneur and founding chairman of African Bank
- James Motlatsi former trade unionist and businessman

=== Entertainment ===
- Nana Coyote, Lesotho born singer
- Joshua Pulumo Mohapeloa, music composer
- Lira, South African singer
- Yvonne Chaka Chaka, South African singer
- Michael Mosoeu Moerane, choral music composer
- Mpho Koaho is a Canadian-born actor of Sotho ancestry
- Terry Pheto, South African actress
- Sankomota, Lesotho jazz band
- Fana Mokoena, South African actor
- Prince Kaybee, South African disc jockey
- Kabelo Mabalane, South African musician and one third of the Kwaito group Tkzee
- Tsepo Tshola, former lead singer of Sankomota jazz band, gospel artist
- Jerry Mofokeng South African actor
- Jerry Phele South African actor
- David Kau South African comedian
- Faith Nketsi South African model and media personality
- Natasha Thahane South African actress
- Maglera Doe Boy South African rapper

=== Literature ===
- Thomas Mofolo Lesotho born author

=== Sports ===
- Khotso Mokoena athlete (Long jump)
- Steve Lekoelea South African football player for Orlando Pirates
- Aaron Mokoena former football player for Jomo Cosmos, Blackburn Rovers, and Portsmouth FC
- Thabo Mooki South African football player who played for Kaizer Chiefs and Bafana Bafana
- Molefi Olifant South African football administrator
- Abia Nale former football player for Kaizer Chiefs
- Teboho Mokoena South African football player
- Lehlohonolo Seema Lesotho born footballer and coach
- Kamohelo Mokotjo South African football player
- Relebohile Mofokeng South African football player
- Lebohang Maboe South African football player for Mamelodi Sundowns

== See also ==
- Sotho–Tswana peoples
- Sotho-Tswana languages
- Tswana people
- Pedi people
- Barotseland
- Lozi people
- Liphofung Historical Site
- Sotho calendar
- Battle of Berea
