= Lebollo la basadi =

Rite of passage ritual

Lebollo la basadi also known as female initiation among the Basotho is a rite of passage ritual which marks the transition of girls into womanhood. This activity is still practiced in the Free State, Mpumalanga, Eastern Cape and KwaZulu Natal provinces of South Africa. In Sesotho, lebollo means initiation. The Basotho rite of passage ritual, unlike other practices in Africa, does not involve procedures which remove parts of the female genital organ. However, the inner folds of the labia are enlarged and elongated by stretching for a more pleasurable sexual experience. In areas where initiation is still valued, uninitiated girls are ridiculed by society.

South African children are compelled by its constitution to attend school. It is for this reason that the initiation schools for girls were made open twice a year, in June and December, so that those who are able to attend in June may do so and for the many who cannot due to school or other reasons may attend in December helping to keep the culture alive.

== Location ==
The rite of passage of lebollo commonly occurs in rural areas where the Basotho are more traditionally oriented. It occurs on farms and small villages where the resources and environment aid in creating the setting for the rituals. Areas with a higher incidence of female initiation include Ficksburg and Clocolan in the Free State as well as in Butha-Buthe and Mphosong in Lesotho. Elongation of the labia is not done in hospitals or clinics as there is no medical requirement for it.

== Timing ==
Basotho female initiation schools are planned to correspond with the rising of the full moon. The full moon symbolizes female sexuality and fertility for the Basotho people. Seasons and favourable conditions are also considered. Some schools take place in October however, many participate in December which allows for scholars to attend during their holiday.

== Age ==
The minimum age for a girl to attend initiation school is 12. Ages of initiation school attendance range from 12 to 20 years old however the generally accepted age for girls is between 15 and 18. The incidence of a girl's first menses, ‘menarche’, is regarded as a positive indication for physical and spiritual readiness for initiation school attendance. While having reached puberty is a good indicator for readiness for joining the initiation school, puberty is not a strict requirement.

== Roles ==
A female traditional healer/traditional surgeon called a ‘’ngaka’’ is required for the initiation practice. The traditional healer is found during the planning stage of the initiation. The traditional healer is believed to have more clarity of natural forces and their interaction with the world. Activities only commence once the ‘ngaka’ arrives. Additional local traditional doctors are sometimes asked to oversee the process however, their presence is not essential.

The promotor, known as ‘monga mophato’ promotes the initiation school thus ‘owns’ the initiation school. Promoters usually devote their entire lives to facilitating initiation schools and become more sought after with more years of experience. The promoter is responsible for supplying food, which includes the slaughtering of animals for ceremonies. It is also the promotor's responsibility to find a reputable traditional healer. The promoters become renowned for their work and are often requested to present an initiation school. They receive remuneration in the form of meat and money. The instructress, known as ‘mosuwe’ in Sesotho, takes responsibility for the care and training of the initiates for the duration of the initiation period. They are also responsible for initiate discipline.

== Legislation ==
The Free State Initiation School Health Act of 2004 (No. 1 of 2004) stipulates criteria and regulations necessary to conduct initiation schools. One of the requirements includes explicit, written permission to host the initiation school and treat initiates by the District Medical Officer. Other requirements include written consent of those over 18 years of age and parental consent for those below the age of 18., a clean bill of health by a primary health care nurse or a medical practitioner. A district Environmental Officer, designated by the MEC, inspects the initiation schools ensuring that there is adequate water supply, hygienic food preparation as well as adequate instruments (if physical circumcision is done). The initiation school may not be held for longer than 2 months and initiates are not to be subject to any form of corporal punishment.

== Initiation ==
Initiation includes rituals or ceremonies that serve to admit the individual into a certain position in society. The purposes of these rites is to announce genital maturity as well as the change in their social status to ‘woman’. Female initiation often correlates with puberty which includes the girls first menstruation..The immediate family plays an integral role in the initiation process of the girl by teaching the initiate how to behave as a woman and also ways to enhance the sexual experience in marriage. The initiation of Basotho girls is more likely to occur in societies where polygamy is practiced therefore the ‘immediate’ family would include various households which aids in creating solidarity between all the women of the family. However, female initiation can also occur where matriarchy or bilocality is the norm.

Societies where women make a significant contribution to the subsistence of the community tend to have initiation ceremonies for the girls in order to educate the girls as well as communities that she is capable of fulfilling her obligations. Additionally, the ceremony emphasizes the importance of the role of the woman in the community. Families strongly encourage initiation from an early age and young girls often witness the initiation of family members and girls from the broader community.

The initiation process includes the Basotho girls transitioning through different phases.“Phepa” is a white soil used by girls on their body and “Pilo”, a black soil, is used as a mask for identification of the different clans. These clans include Bataung, Bahlakoana, Bakoena, Bafokeng, Basiea, and Baphuthing. The initiators know which tribe is eligible to use a certain soil type or both of them for identification.

=== Labial elongation ===
The girls are taught to self elongate their labia. The labia is enlarged through massaging and stretching from the top to the bottom of the labia using the tips of the thumb and the index finger. Different herbs are ground and converted into a paste in order to ease tension while pulling. These herbs are believed to soften and lubricate the labia to reduce the risk of any skin lacerations. The World Health Organization classified inner labial elongation as a Type IV female genital mutilation (non excisional type) in 2002. This was criticized by some scholars such as Gallo, Marian Koster MSc and Dr. Lisa Price of Wageningen University, Netherlands as they believed it should be classified as ‘ethnic genital modification’. This led the WHO amending their classification of it to "modification" instead of ‘mutilation’ in February 2008. The practice of labial stretching in Basotho women does not violate women's rights as it does not involve physical violence, unless the woman is misled as to the benefits of the practice. Basotho girls undergoing initiation assist each other to elongate the labia and are therefore able to compete about who has the longest labia. The girls are told that elongated labia increases sexual pleasure for their future husbands and that elongation increases a woman's chances of marriage. Some initiates report it being painful however others find pleasure in the practice. Many girls also believe that if they do not elongate their labia, they could experience difficulty giving birth. Due to the sometimes competitive nature of labial elongation, some girls resort in dangerous measures in order to elongate the labia. Some girls have been known to tie a piece of string to the labia and attached a small stone to assist in the pulling and others have been known to use the incorrect herbs resulting in rashes. Many of these alternative practices are done without the supervision of the traditional healers. Girls who experience complications are admitted to hospitals/ clinics.

Possible complications include itching, swelling, minor tears and pain.

Basotho women who have elongated their labia are unable to confirm whether the elongation assisted in the child birthing process as many feel they experience the same as women who did not undergo elongation. Basotho women also report on their husbands having sexual relations with women who have not had their labia elongated and are therefore not convinced of the efficacy of elongated labia lips in sexual satisfaction.

== Initiation dress ==
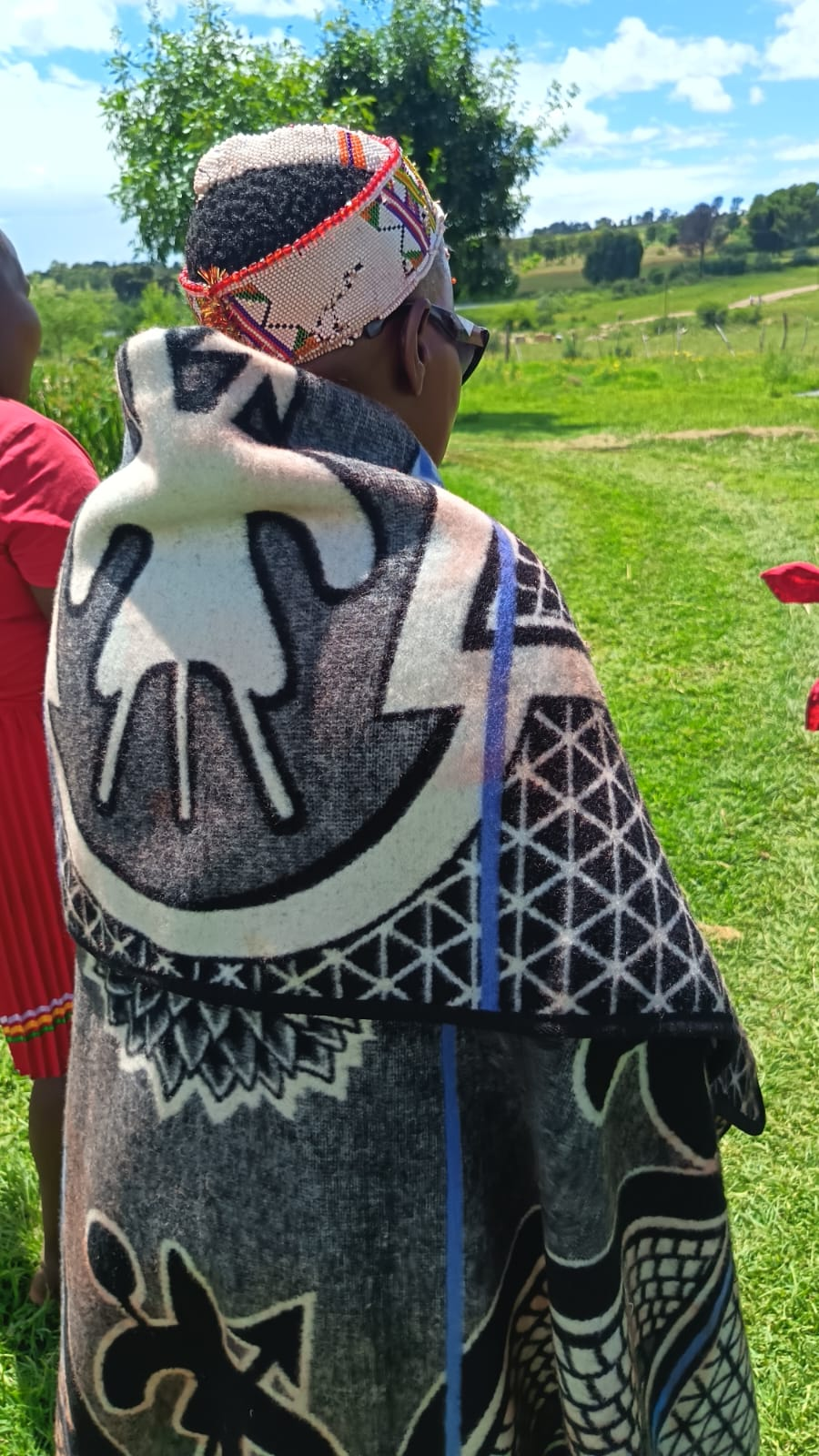
Setswejane, a Basotho woman coming from initiation school

The outfits worn during initiation require much attention. The preparation period for Basotho girls in Lesotho can be lengthy however, in the Free State, the preparation can be done within a day. The girl receives a sheepskin blanket from her maternal uncle or any other male representative. On the first day, the girls usually wear an old linen dress and an old dull blanket. This attire is discarded soon after and is replaced by a cowhide or sheepskin skirt. The girl is also given a veil as well as a grass or reed hoop which grows along the river banks called ‘dikgolokwane’ to wear around the waist. The girls also wear handcrafted clay necklaces. The girl leaves the initiation school wearing an elegant cowhide dress, beads, ornaments, new blankets, colourful towels and red-ochre.

== The initiates ==
Initiates are ranked according to a totem position. The most senior initiate is called the ‘Molobe’ followed by ‘Molobenyana’ or ‘Lelate’ and the most junior position is called ‘Senkoyhi’ however, this ranking system is not always applied and its use is area dependent. The girl initiate may undergo initiation with a female relative including sisters, father's younger sisters, mother's younger sister or niece. She may not be in the same initiation school or time as her mother, mother's older sister or grandmother. In the case that relatives are in the same initiation school, it is customary to place a knob-stick in the fence of the initiation school entrance. The relatives are also to enter and exit the initiation school from opposite sides of the stick.

== See also ==
- Lebollo la banna
- Basotho blanket
- Circumcision in Africa
- Sacred caves of the Basotho
- Prevalence of female genital mutilation by country
