= Modimo =

"God" in some southern African languages

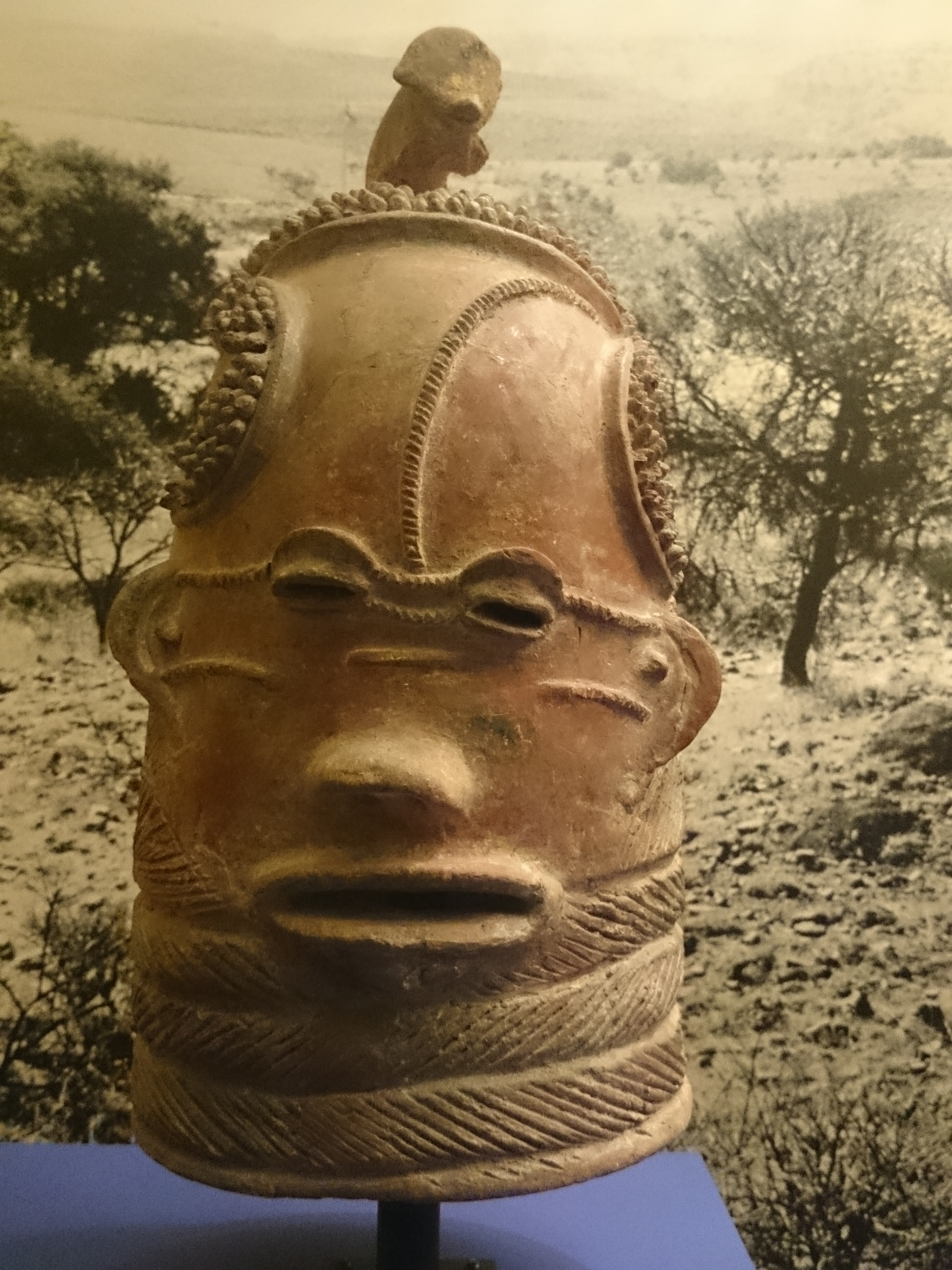
- The Lydenburg Heads used in the rituals of the Bantu-speaking people, in possible connection to Modimo
- Ethnic group: Sotho-Tswana peoples Basotho, Batswana, Bapedi

Modimo (also spelt as Molimo in Lesotho Sesotho, and known as Mudzimu or Raluvhimba in Tshivenda and uMlimo or Zimu in Southern and Northern Ndebele) is a creator god, supreme deity and sky deity in the traditional religion of the Sotho-Tswana people. Modimo and all its derivatives ultimately stem from the proto-Sotho-Tswana prefix *mo- which indicates personhood + *-dzimu "above, in the sky" and so Modimo can be translated to mean "the high one" or "the sky-deity" or "the one above" or "the Supreme Deity" or merely "the high god" in English. Modimo is the equivalent of the Xhosa Supreme Deity Qamata and the Zulu Supreme Deity uMvelinqangi and the Shona Supreme Deity Mwari.

== Meaning and origins ==
In Sotho-Tswana cultures, the concept of Modimo is deeply rooted in traditional religious beliefs. Modimo is often ascribed feats such as the creation of the universe and is considered the highest spiritual authority. There are various other names for Modimo such as Mmopi, Tlatlamatjholo (or Tlatlamacholo or Hla-Hla Macholo), Ramasedi or Rammoloki or Raluvhimba. Modimo is often described as a genderless, formless, omnipresent and omnipotent maker. Modimo is the most supreme deity in a pantheon of different deities and deified ancestors, or Badimo, and mythological figures of the Sotho-Tswana people. There are various legends, stories and mythologies regarding Modimo amongst the Sotho-Tswana people.

== Beliefs, mythologies and legends ==
The reverence for Modimo often extends to traditional rituals and ceremonies. Many traditional practices involve prayers, songs, and offerings to seek the favor or blessings of the divine. Although Modimo is the most powerful being in the order of creation of the Sotho-Tswana religion, they are often seen as a deistic god who can be appealed to through intermediaries like the ancestors or Badimo, who are believed to be closer to Modimo in the underworld.

== Modimo in Christianity ==
Before the arrival of European colonizers, the various Bantu-speaking communities in Southern Africa had their own distinct spiritual beliefs and practices. The concept of a supreme being, often referred to as "Modimo" or similar names in different Bantu languages, was central to these belief systems. The supreme being was seen as the creator of the universe and the source of life.

With the advent of European colonialism in the 19th and 20th centuries, there was a significant impact on indigenous belief systems. Missionaries played a role in introducing Christianity to the region, leading to the spread of Western religious influences. However, many African communities integrated their traditional beliefs with Christianity, resulting in syncretic forms of worship.

The term "Modimo" persisted and adapted to coexist with Christianity in many cases. Some communities blended traditional practices with Christian elements, creating a syncretic belief system that incorporated aspects of both worlds. This syncretism allowed for the preservation of cultural and spiritual identity while also incorporating new religious influences.

Many people in Southern Africa continue to find meaning and cultural identity in their traditional beliefs, which include a reverence for the supreme being.
