= Islam in Botswana =

Country with minority Islam presence

Similar to most other Southern African countries, the predominant religion in Botswana is Christianity although there is the presence of a small Muslim minority, accounting for about 11 000 people as per the 2011 census. Despite only representing a very small percentage of the countries total population today, less than 1%, the religion retains a stable presence and has been part of the country already since the end of the 19th century with the arrival of Muslim Indian traders.

== History ==
The arrival of Islam and its subsequent presence can be attributed to the efforts of a few key individuals that played an active role in bringing the religion to the country. Muslim Indian traders from South Africa began to make their way into the territory around the end of the 19th century with the first recorded instance in 1882 when a certain Bhana, an Indian Muslim, set up trading posts which he bought from European settlers in Moshupa and Molepolole. The East coast of South Africa experienced a notable immigration of Indians, some of whome were Muslim, between 1860 and 1910 under the British as their plantation and trade economy grew, some brought there as indentured labourers and others came to trade. Bhana was followed by other Muslim Indian traders such as Banu Vahed who invited their families to come and settle with them thus inaugurating the presence of small Muslim communities in Botswana. Even until today the Muslim community in Botswana is can be characterised by several communities existing in different localities though now it is more diversified.

=== Ramotswa ===
The biggest and most prominent of these early Muslim settlements was Ramotswa, located just South of the capital of Gaborone. Its location made it a centre and main stay for the early Islam community in Botswana aided by its geographic location and its proximity to the South African town of Zeerust which boasted a larger Indian Muslim population and even a school in Islam where some of the early Muslim settlers returned to receive education in the orinciples of Islam. The first Muslim trader who settled there was Sheikhnag Mohedin who established his business there in 1886 and was followed by many other members in the following years bringing the town the status of a pilgrimage site for all Muslims who had had settled in Botswana to go there during holy celebrations.

=== The slow spread of Islam ===
Islam and its spread in Botswana were slow due to the prerogatives of the Indian Muslim population who saw themselves first and foremost as traders and business people rather than as propagators of the Islamic Faith. It is also speculated that, despite being devoutly Muslim in practice, many had only a basic understanding of their faith and did not give credence to Urdu translations of the Quran thus relying on Arabic interpreters of the Quran who were largely non-existent. These factors, combined with a colonial regime which greatly favoured white European busniness interests over Indian business interests and relegated Muslim Indian communities to sparsely populated places through segragationist policies meant that Islam altogether was challenged to spread quickly through Botswana.

=== Lobatse ===
Later, Ramotswa was replaced by Lobatse as the centre of Islam in Botswana largely due to its growing Indian Muslim population and the fact that the town was exempt from racialised policies surrounding trade in colonial Botswana thus attracting Indian Muslim traders. It was also closer to Mafeking, the former administrative capital of Botswana. Lobatse's status as an Islamic centre in Botwsana was bolstered with the presence of an Indian Muslim boarding school being built in 1961 under growing pressure and demand from the growing Indian Muslim community in the country and even more so with the creation of the country's first Mosque being built in 1967. The Mosque cemented the Indian Islam community in Botswana and its creation marked a new era for Muslims also as the country gained independence in 1966.

== Islam today in Botswana ==
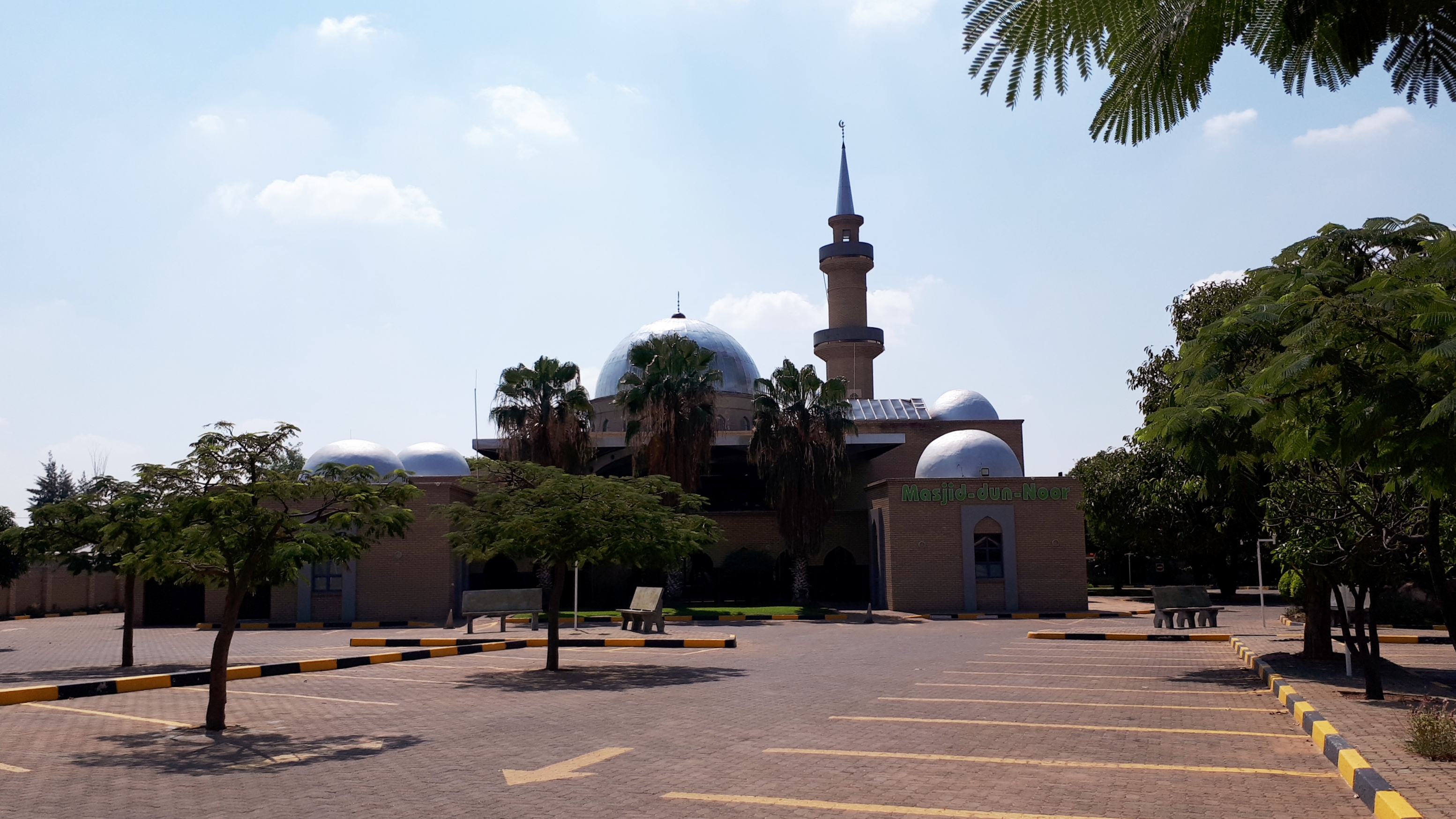
Mosque in Gaborone, Botswana

Today Islam in Botswana has become more varied and diversfied in amongst its practitioners in Botswana although the Indian Muslim heritage still plays a big role in its presence. In the post independent era, Islam has also been adopted by many Batswana and thus become socially integrated in contemporary Botswana, playing an active role in private and public spheres. Islam in Botswana is inseparable from several larger Muslim organisations and their affiliates which maintain a strong and active presence in the country. The biggest is the Botswana Muslim Association (BMA) which was formed in Ramotswa between 1900 and 1920. Formerly known as the British Indian Mohammedan society, it changed its name after independence to become more inclusive and open to all in Botswana society. Most other Muslim organisations fall under the BMA such as the Muslim Youth Movement (MYM) or the former Al Muslimah, a women's wing of the BMA.
