= Stimela (band) =

South African band

- Origin: South Africa
- Genres: Afro fusion; jazz
- Years active: 1970s–present
- Labels: Gallo; TM Performing Arts Management
- Members: Jabu S'bumbe; Joy White; Thapelo Khomo; Ntokozo Zungu; Sam Ndlovu; Bafana Khuzwayo; Charles "Dibabas" Ndlovu; Sizwe Mashinini
- Past members: Ray Phiri; Nana Coyote; Isaac "Mnca" Mtshali; Thabo Lloyd Lelosa; Bafana Khuzwayo

Stimela is a South African band which emerged as an afrofusion ensemble in the 1980s under the leadership of guitarist Ray Phiri best known for his collaboration on Paul Simon's Graceland and The Rhythm of the Saints, albums.

== Early years ==
Stimela originated from a soul band called The Cannibals. Established by Phiri in the 1970s, the band attained a series of successful singles in South Africa. In the early 1980s, Phiri and former members of The Cannibals came together to form Stimela (meaning "steam train"). Ray Phiri assumed leadership of the band,as a guitarist, handling songwriting and frequently taking on lead vocals. Joy White was the band's initial vocalist.

Subsequently, the band underwent expansion with the addition of new members Charlie "Sam" Ndlovu, Nana Coyote, Thapelo Kgomo, Jacob "Mparanyana" Radebe and Ntokozo Zungu.

The band's name transitioned to Stimela following a transformative event in Mozambique, where they found themselves stranded in Maputo for three months. Forced to sell all their possessions to afford a train journey back home, this experience became pivotal as it inspired the band's new name, Stimela.

== Career ==
The band achieved platinum status with albums like Fire, Passion and Ecstasy, Listen, Look and Decide and the controversial People Don't Talk, So Let's Talk.

== Apartheid state-controlled songs ban ==
Stimela's song, "Whispers in the Deep," lyrics' prompted, "speak your mind, don’t be afraid" faced broadcast restrictions by the former South African Broadcasting Corporation as Stimela's music occasionally confronted the boundaries of what could be openly expressed during apartheid.

== Artistry ==
Afrofusion constituted the core sound of Stimela. Stimela combined jazz and R&B with traditional South African rhythmic styles such as mbaqanga.

== Band members ==
- Ray Phiri (1947–2017) - lead guitar, lead vocals
- Sam Ndlovu - Lead Vocals
- Isaac "Mnca" Mtshali (1955–2019) - drummer
- Nana Coyote (1955–2010) - lead vocals
- Thapelo Khomo - Keyboards/Piano/Synthesizers
- Ntokozo Zungu - lead guitar
- Bafana Khuzwayo (1978-2017) - organ
- Lloyd Lelosa (1955-2021) - Keyboards/Piano
- Jabu Sibumbe - Bass
- Sandile Ngema - Bass
- Charles "Dibabas" Ndlovu (***-2009) - Organ
- Sizwe Mashinini - Keyboards

== Discography ==
- 1982: Mama Wami
- 1982: The Cannibals
- 1983: I Hate Telling A Lie /I Love You
- 1984: Fire, Passion and Ecstasy
- 1985: Shadows, Fear and Pain
- 1986: Look, Listen and Decide
- 1986: Rewind (EP)
- 1987: The Unfinished Story
- 1988: Live!
- 1989: Trouble In The Land of Plenty
- 1990: The 2nd Half
- 1991: Siyaya
- 1992: Khululani
- 1993: Are You Ready (Live Album)
- 1994: Don't Ask Why
- 1995: Are You Ready (Live)
- 1996: Out of the Ashes
- 2000: Steam Tracks (Best of)
- 2001: Live At The Market Theatre - 1st Half (Stimela 1988 Live Re-Release )
- 2002: The 2nd Half (Re-release)
- 2010: A Lifetime...
- 2011: Turn on the Sun
- 2018: Catch The Train
