= Basotho blanket =

Woollen blanket in Lesotho and South Africa

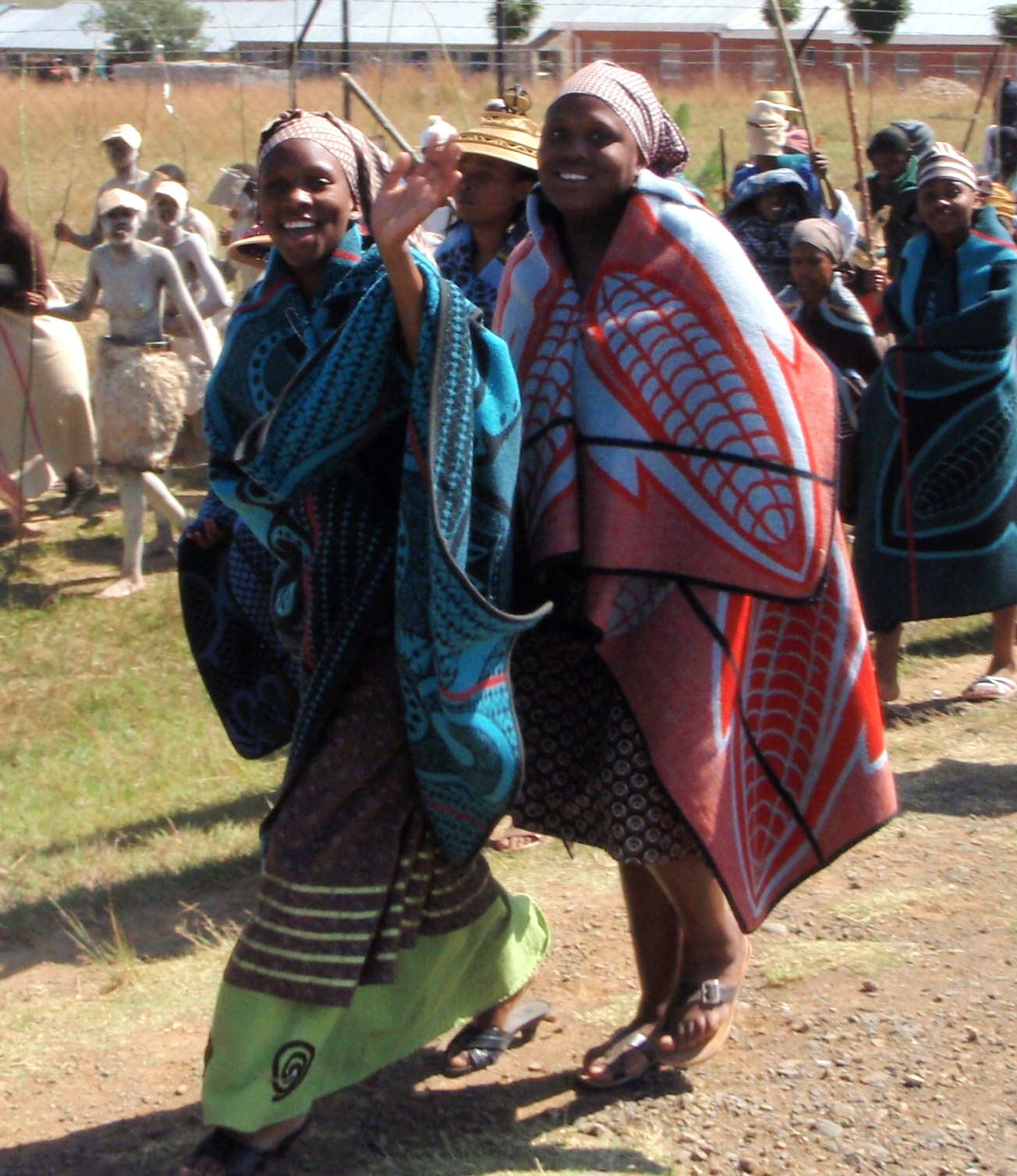
Basotho women wearing blankets

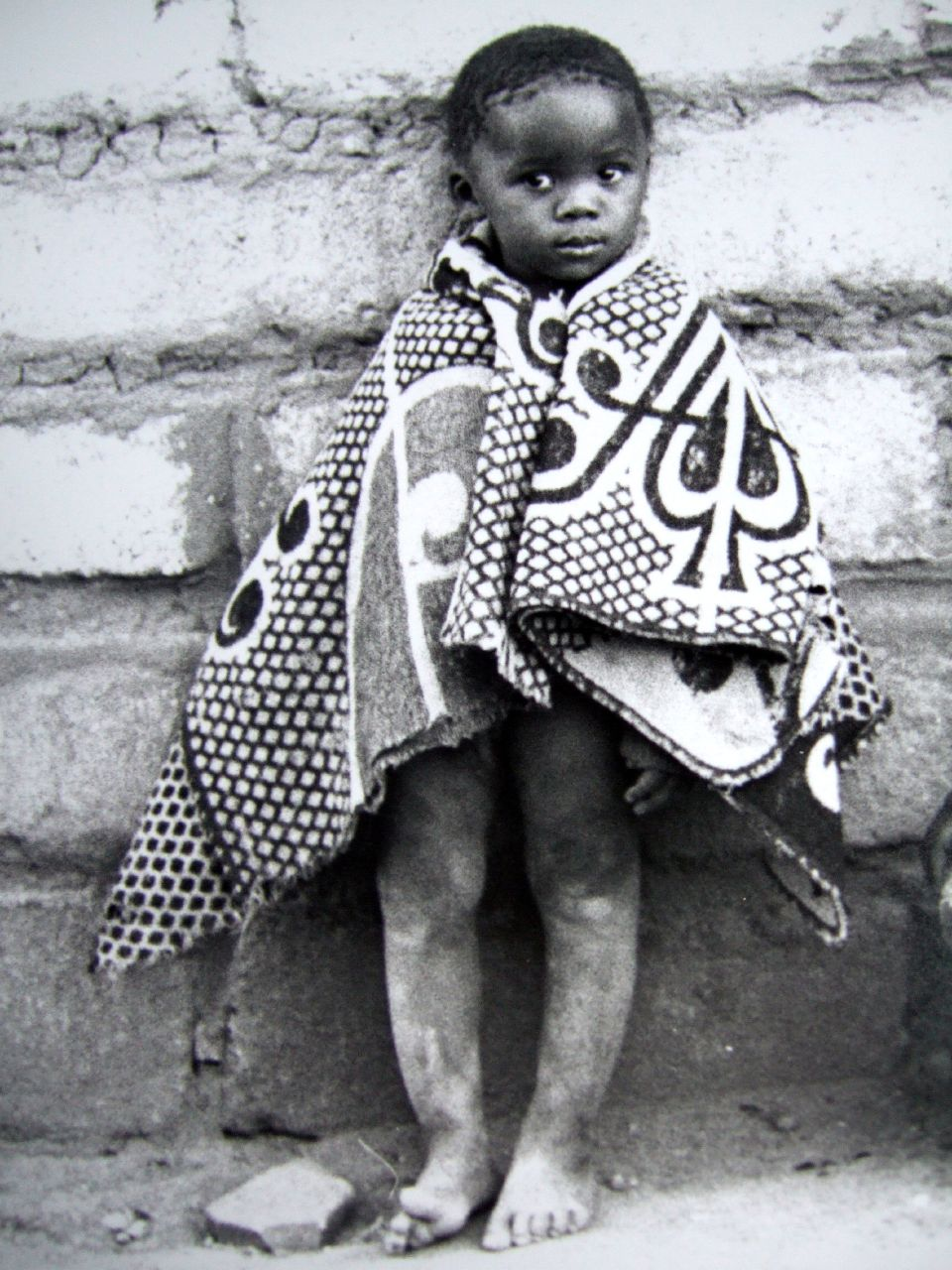
Child wrapped in a traditional Basotho blanket

The Basotho blanket is a distinctive form of garment commonly worn by Sotho people in Lesotho and South Africa. Initially composed of pure wool, the material makeup of Basotho blankets has undergone significant transformation in response to shifting economic conditions and technological advances in recent decades, which has prompted a transition to a textile blend consisting of 50% merino wool and 50% dralon, a mix of wool and cotton, or exclusively acrylic fibers.

== History ==
Originally gifted to the then ruler King Moshoeshoe I by a British man known only as "Mr Howell" in the late 19th century, these blankets quickly gained popularity in the Lesotho region.

The way that Basotho men wear these traditional blankets is based on the traditional Kaross, an animal skin cloak although their transformation to "factory-woven textile" is attributed to King Moshoeshoe I. By 1860 securing sufficient skins for Karosses was increasingly difficult and by 1872 a large majority of sheepskin covers had been replaced by poor quality cotton or wool. The King secured the production of "special blankets" in 1876 after meeting with English textile manufacturer and merchant Donald Fraser. These new blankets were not only sturdier but they could also be fashioned in a way that more resembled the Kaross and they therefore quickly replaced the poor quality imported cloth that the people of Lesotho were previously wearing.

== Ceremonial use ==
Across the Kingdom, a variety of these blankets are worn by the people of Lesotho to represent the different rites of passage in society.

The Moholobela is a fertility blanket worn by young Sotho men in preparation of their transition to manhood. After the initiation ceremony, the young men in Lesotho will don a different blanket known as the Lekhokolo, which confirms that they have reached adulthood.

It used to be the case that a Mosotho bride would wear a Motlotlehi blanket on their wedding day, but the Lingoetsi blanket has since replaced its obsolete counterpart. Husbands, on the other hand, traditionally gift their wife a Serope blanket when their first child is born.

Seana Marena: Means chief's blanket or to swear by the king: This particular blanket is exclusively worn by the king and his chiefs, it has the highest status of all Basotho blankets.

Lehlosi: A Chiefly blanket made of patterns from the skin of wild cat or leopards. At present, one will often observe chiefs wearing commercially manufactured blankets bearing the print of a leopard, rather than actual leopard skins.

Victorian/ Malakabane: According to a local legend, in 1897 Queen Victoria visited Lesotho (this did not actually occur, but that year marked the Diamond Jubilee of Queen Victoria). The legend states that she gave King Lerotholi Letsie a gift, which happened to be a blanket. He wore the blanket with elegance, in a manner that represented the Poncho, over his shoulders and there the blanket wearing tradition began. In reality, in 1897 Donald Fraser designed a blanket that could replace the leopard skins, which became rare, and called it the Victoria England to commemorate Queen Victoria's diamond jubilee. The Sotho people had a great love and respect for Queen Victoria and the Victoria England blanket has become a sought after status symbol.

Motlatsi: designed and produced to pay tribute to the birth of Prince Lerotholi. Motlatsi means "successor".

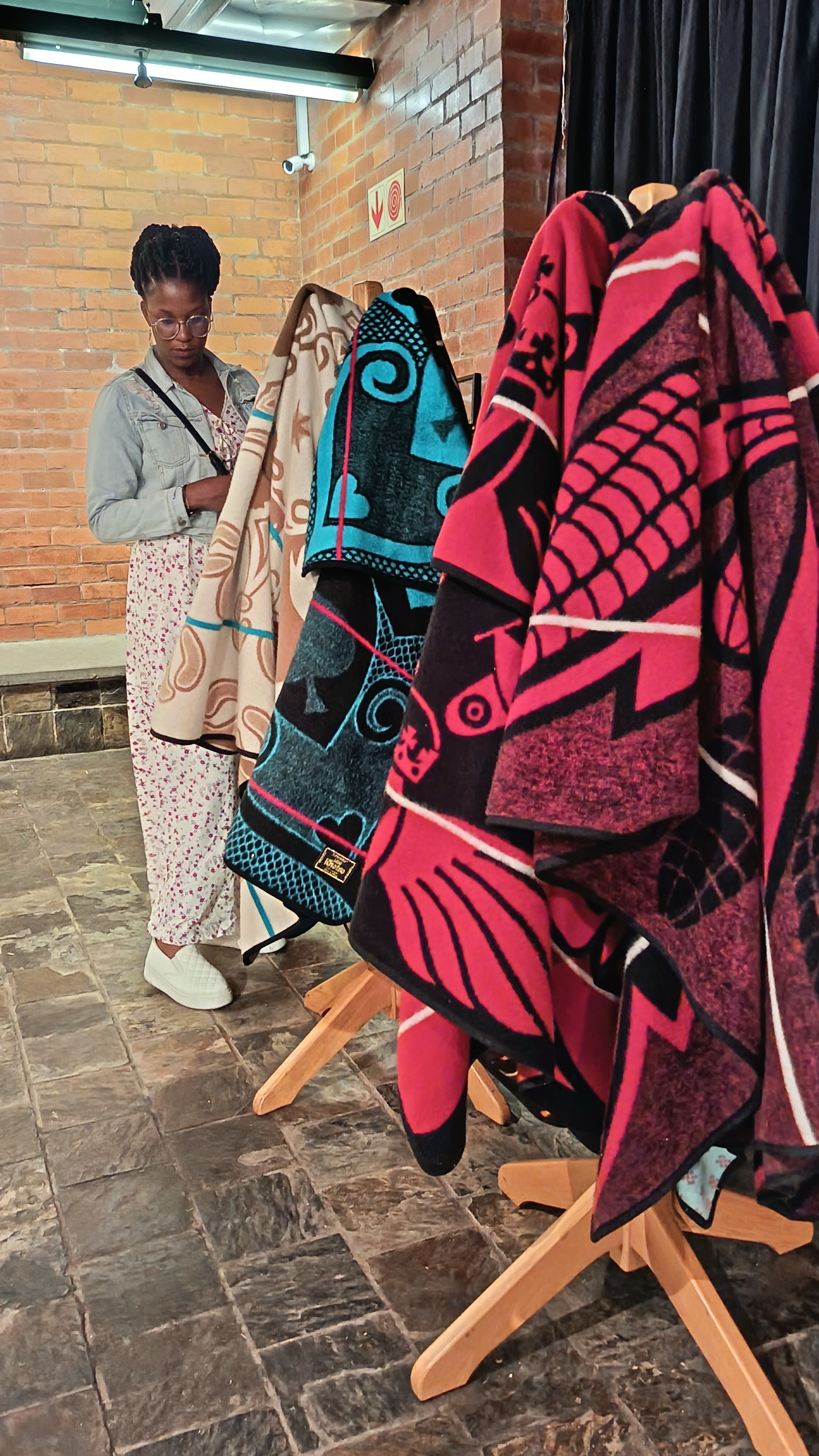
Different Basotho blankets on display at the Oliewenhuis Art Museum, Bloemfontein, South Africa.

Letlama: worn by traditionally initiated men & women " tlama" is to tie "ke e tlametse mathata aseng basali ba batho" ("I have tied it(the blanket) for my own problems not for other men's wives') is what one who wears this particular blanket would say.

Lingoetsi: a bride's blanket.

Batho Ba Roma: remembering Pope John Paul's visit to Lesotho in 1988.

Kharetsa: named after the aloe which is indigenous to the Maloti Mountains of Lesotho.

Sefate and Morena: are used by the Basotho people as an everyday wearing blanket.

Ketelo ea Morena Papa which means the visit of the Pope: Pope John Paul II once had a visit to Lesotho in 1988, a blanket gift was given to him which has been placed in the Vatican in Rome.

== In popular culture ==
Louis Vuitton's designs for the 2017 menswear collection featured designs from Basotho Blankets which caused controversy in South Africa with accusations of cultural appropriation. Fashion designer Thabo Makhetha-Kwinana is known for her Basotho blankets designs.

In the 2018 films Black Panther and in Avengers: Infinity War, W'Kabi and his tribesmen appear in many scenes wearing what looks like the Basotho blanket. Given that the actors in the film were not from Continental Africa, several continental African groups viewed the appropriation of these cultural symbols as inappropriate for use by diasporic Africans. However, the film brought the blankets to international attention and caused an increase in sales.

== See also ==
- Specific visual symbols related to the coming of age ceremony lebollo la basadi
- Lebollo la banna
