= Liphofung Historical Site =

Historical site in Lesotho

- location in Lesotho
- 28°47′4″S 28°14′1″E
- Periods: Neolithic
- Cultures: San people
- Location: Clarens sandstone
- Region: Lesotho

The Liphofung (“place of the eland”) Historical Site includes a cave which occupies an important place in Lesotho history. It is the smallest of the Lesotho Highlands Development Authority (LHDA) reserves, at about 4.5 ha (11 acres), but has been intensively developed. The cave is a large overhang in the Clarens sandstone, which is a typical feature of the Lesotho lowlands region. Originally used by the San people and other Neolithic people, the walls contain important rock art and a rich archaeological deposit of Stone Age implements lies beneath the floor. Later, King Moshoeshoe the Great used the cave as a stopover when visiting that part of the kingdom.

The site is located in a tributary-stream valley of the Hololo River, off the main route from Butha-Buthe to Oxbow and Mokhotlong. Access is via a concrete road which is passable for all vehicles. A visitors' centre, featuring a display of Basotho culture and San rock art has been developed, along with restrooms and a small shop. The site is a popular destination of school groups and tourists traveling to Oxbow, and light refreshments are available.

Apart from the cultural and historical aspects of the site, there are also various geological features to be seen, both on-site and in the surrounding areas. Since the 'Moteng Valley is densely populated, it is a good opportunity to observe the traditional Basotho way of life.

The site was developed almost entirely by local labour and artisans; therefore, most of the development costs have been ploughed directly back into the local community.
