= Botswana Council of Churches =

- Founded: 1966
- Location: Extension 12 Plot 3283, Gaborone, Botswana
- Website: https://www.facebook.com/botswanacouncilofchurches/

The Botswana Council of Churches (BCC) is an ecumenical Christian organization in Botswana. It was founded in 1966 and is a member of the World Council of Churches and the Fellowship of Christian Councils in Southern Africa.

== Members ==
- Anglican Diocese of Botswana
- Church of God in Christ
- Dutch Reformed Church in Botswana
- Evangelical Lutheran Church in Botswana
- Evangelical Lutheran Church in Southern Africa
- Lamb's Followers Apostles Church
- Methodist Church of Southern Africa
- Revelation Blessed Peace Church
- Roman Catholic Church
- St Apostolic Church in Botswana
- St Isaac Church in Salvation
- St Paul's Apostolic Mission
- United Congregational Church of Southern Africa
- Utlwang Lefoko Apostolic Church

== Associate Members ==
- Association of Medical Missions in Botswana
- Bible Society in Botswana
- Christian Women's Fellowship
- Jesus Generation Movement
- Kgolagano College of Theological Education
- Mennonite Ministries in Botswana
- Young Women's Christian Association
