= Victory International Centre =

Church in Masunga, Botswana

Victory International Centre, is a church in Botswana started and led by motivational speaker Pastor K. T. K. Seloma. It is headquartered in Masunga, a village in the North-East District of Botswana. Other branches are in Gaborone, Tlokweng, the capital city of Botswana, in Tonota in the Central District, and in Tsamaya, another village in the North-East District.
