= United Congregational Church of Southern Africa =

Christian denomination

- Classification: Protestant
- Theology: Congregationalist (Reformed)
- Associations: World Communion of Reformed Churches
- Region: South Africa, Mozambique, Botswana, Zimbabwe, Namibia
- Headquarters: 10, 7th Avenue, Edenvale, Johannesburg, South Africa.
- Congregations: 400
- Members: ~1 000 000+
- Official website: www.uccsadenomination.org.za

The United Congregational Church of Southern Africa (UCCSA) is a prominent Christian denomination established in 1967, following the unification of various congregational movements within Southern Africa. Its origins can be traced back to the missionary work of the London Missionary Society in the Cape Colony in 1799. The UCCSA plays a significant role in the religious landscape of Southern Africa, with a membership of approximately 1 000 000. It maintains a notable presence in countries such as South Africa, Mozambique, Botswana, Zimbabwe, and Namibia. The UCCSA is recognized for its contributions to education and social justice in the region.

== History ==
The UCCSA has its roots in the early missionary efforts of the London Missionary Society (LMS). The LMS initiated its work in the Cape Colony in 1799, led by missionaries like Dr. Theodorus van der Kemp. The first Congregational church in Cape Town was established by them in 1801. Notable LMS missionaries, including David Livingstone, extended their evangelical efforts among the Tswana and Amandbele peoples.

Post-1820, English and Welsh settlers formed their own congregational congregations. Further expansion occurred with the arrival of missionaries from the American Board of Commissioners for Foreign Missions in 1830 in KwaZulu-Natal. The congregations formed by white settlers eventually led to the creation of the Congregational Union of South Africa. These various missionary and congregational movements culminated in the unification of the three bodies to form the United Congregational Church of Southern Africa in 1967.

== Membership and influence ==
The UCCSA boasts a significant membership, with over 1 000 000+ members across 1000 local congregations as of 2024. This denomination is also a member of the World Communion of Reformed Churches.

== Regional influence ==
=== Mozambique ===
In Mozambique, the UCCSA operates under the Portuguese name Igreja Congregacional Unida do Africa do Sul, with the central office located in Maputo. The Mozambique Synod traces its origins back to the first evangelist, Rev. Edwin Richards, sent in 1880 by the American Board of Commissioners for Foreign Missions. Despite a period of transition where Richards and many members joined the Methodist church, a portion retained their congregational heritage. Currently, the church in Mozambique has 13,400 members in 27 congregations, primarily located in Inhambane, Gaza Province, and Maputo. The official languages used are Portuguese, Xitxe, Tsonga, and Tyopi.

=== Botswana ===
In Botswana, the UCCSA has 51 congregations and over 20,300 members. The denomination is a member of the Botswana Council of Churches.

=== Zimbabwe ===
The UCCSA in Zimbabwe operates several schools and, as of 1995, had 160 congregations..

=== Namibia ===
The Namibia Regional Council of the UCCSA, formed in 1982, consists of 3,000 members across 7 congregations located in Duineveld, Rehoboth, Karlfeld, Windhoek, Luderitz, Walvis Bay, Swakopmund, Grootfrontein. The establishment of these congregations dates back to 1933 when congregational people began moving to Namibia.
