= Badimo =

Ancestor-venerating religion

Badimo (Sotho-Tswana literally meaning "ancestors") is the name for the traditional African practice of ancestor veneration for the Sotho-Tswana people of Botswana, Lesotho and South Africa. Although most Sotho-Tswana people are Christians, in reality a great majority of them follow at least some of the traditions deemed Badimo even if they are strong followers of another religion as well.

The term "Badimo", although usually translated as "ancestors" does not simply refer to people who are now dead, but rather to the "living dead". In the traditional African worldview, deceased ancestors continue to be present and are actively included in the daily life of individuals and tribes. It is believed that when someone dies, they go to live in the underworld. From there, they can watch over the living and punish those who displease them. The punishment upon the individual may be an unsuccessful life, sickness, accidents or non achievement. In order to appease Badimo or render them propitious, one should make offerings of beer, sheep or goats.

== Origin ==
They are invisible and only heard by children and older people. They speak their own language and make violent wind sounds whenever they move. They aid people in health and can determine whether or not a person remains healthy or not with their presence. There were many cases of young boys who were kidnapped and returned, knowing the full Badimo language. These children are chosen to deal with the Badimo when they join future delegations. There are traditional ceremonies and rituals held every year before the first rains to thank the ancestors for the good yields of the past year. During these rituals, traditional beer is brewed and a beast is killed, cooked, and taken to the hills where the Badimo are hidden, the place is called Badimong or Difokeng. The delegation would leave this food and come back later to discuss with the Badimo and collect the utensils. The delegation would tell the Badimo what the community felt about their lives. If the Badimo were satisfied, they would tell the delegation what their expectations were for the community. The Badimo also serve the purpose of notifying the next of kin about a death or if someone is dying.

== Religious diversity ==
Badimo, among other traditional religions, is mixed in with the most dominant religion in Botswana, Lesotho and South Africa where only a small percentage of people practice pure Christianity.
