= Sankomota =

Lesotho Afro-Jazz Band

- Also known as: Uhuru
- Origin: Maseru, Lesotho
- Genres: Afro-Jazz, Rock fusion
- Years active: 1976–present
- Label: Shifty Records
- Members: Moss Nkofo; Black Jesus; Pitso Sera
- Past members: Tsepo Tshola (deceased); Frank Leepa (deceased)

Sankomota is an Afro-jazz fusion band formed in 1976 in Lesotho. The band consisted of several members in its earliest years; Frank Leepa (guitarist, vocalist, arranger, composer), Moss Nkofo (drummer), Black Jesus (percussion), Moruti Selate (bass), Tsepo Tshola (lead vocalist and composer), and Pitso Sera (guitar), among others. Sankomota was managed by Peter B. Scheider until 1979. Later, under the management of Leepa, Sankomota's career spanned out over two decades.

== History ==
Frank Leepa, also known as the Captain, started the band in school, calling it Anti Antiques. The band later changed its name to Uhuru, meaning 'freedom' in Swahili. However, due to the popularity of Black Uhuru from Jamaica, under the advisement of Schneider, the band decided to change their name again in order to avoid confusion. The name 'Sankomota' was chosen due to its symbolism, meaning phantom or poltergeist in the Sesotho language, as well as it being the name of a warrior from the Basotho and Bapedi people during the reign of King Moshoeshoe. Sankomota was the first band to record an LP in Lesotho. They were recorded by Lloyd Ross and Warrick Sony of Shifty Records on November 11, 1983. The album was self-titled, and it had nine tracks that collectively ran under 50 minutes long.

In 1991, Tsepo Tshola, the band's lead singer, left to pursue a solo career. In 1996, on the way to Cape Town, South Africa, the band suffered a road accident that killed unnamed members of the band.

Frank Leepa died on 27 November 2003 and Tshola died of COVID related complications on 15 July 2021.

== Discography ==
- Sankomota (1984)
- Dreams Do Come True (1987)
- The Writing on the Wall (1989)
- Exploration - A New Phase (1991)
- After the Storm (1993)
- The Best of 1981-1991 (1995)
- Frankly Speaking (2001)
