= Tsepo Tshola =

Lesotho jazz musician (1953–2021)

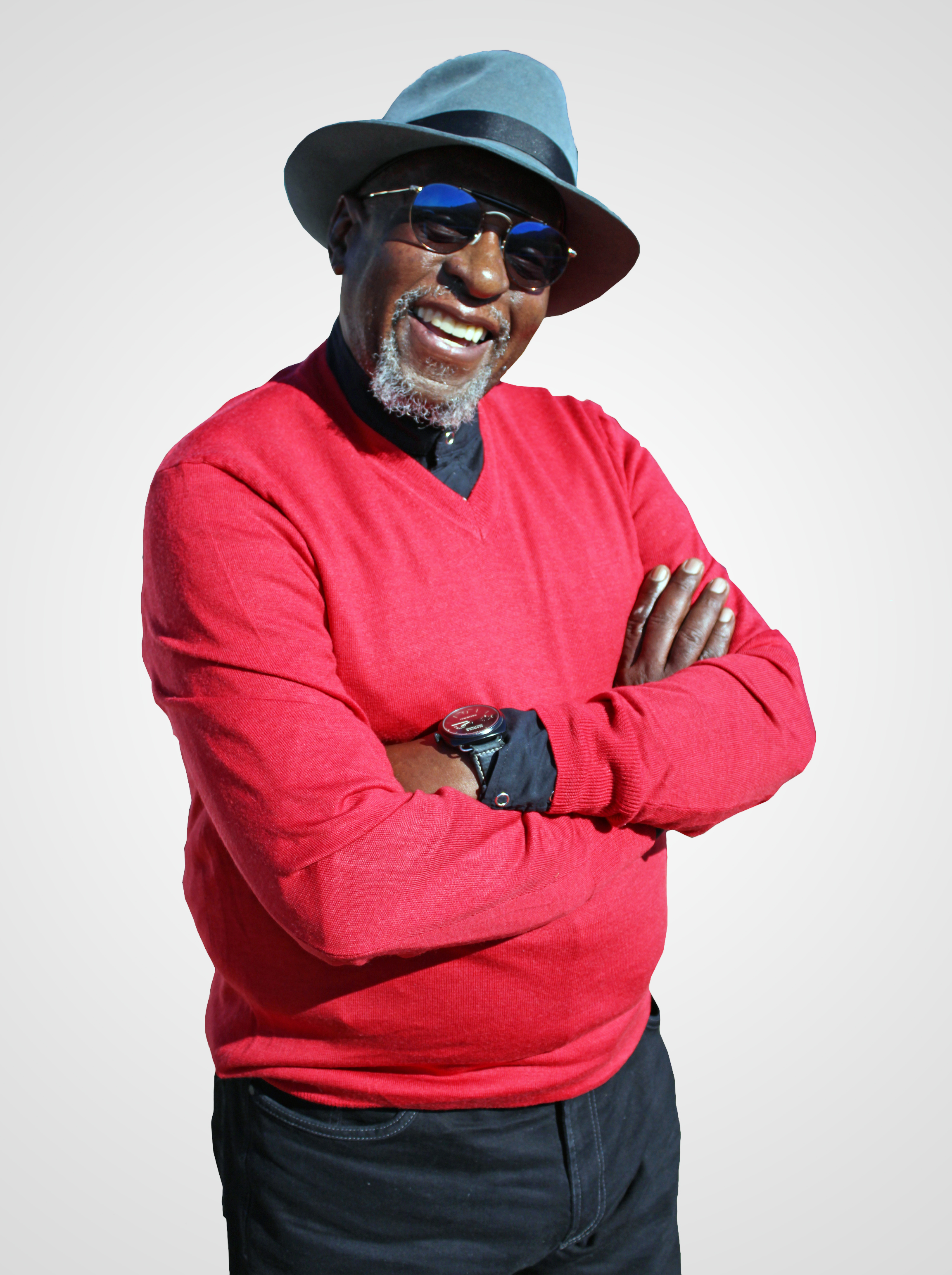

Background information
- Also known as: The Village Pope
- Born: Tsepo Mobu Tshola; August 18, 1953; Teyateyaneng, Lesotho
- Origin: Maseru, Lesotho
- Died: July 15, 2021 (aged 67)
- Genres: Afro jazz
- Years active: 1970–2021
- Formerly of: Sankomota

Tsepo Mobu Tshola (18 August 1953 – 15 July 2021) was a Lesotho-born jazz musician. He was a member of the Afro-jazz fusion band Sankomota as a songwriter and lead singer.

== Early life ==
Tsepo Mobu Tshola was born on 18 August 1953 in Teyateyaneng, Lesotho. His father was a minister and this gave him an interest in and connection to religious music, and later Sesotho music.

Tshola began singing professionally in 1970 as part of a group called Lesotho Blue Diamonds. He later joined Anti Antiques, which changed its name to Uhuru in the late 1970s. Tshola, alongside several other band members, formed a new group called Sankomota.

== Solo career ==
Tshola released his debut studio album The Village Pope in 1994, the title of which would later become the stage name he was known as. It included the song Ho Lokile, an adaptation of a Sesotho hymn which he recorded in memory of his late wife. In 2001, Tshola released his second studio album entitled A New Dawn, which included the songs Nonyana and Ntate. He went on to release several more albums, notably Lesedi, Let's Hold Hands, Reconciliation and Ask Me.

Tshola has performed in many countries overseas and collaborated with South African musicians such as Rebecca Malope, Jub-Jub and Casper Nyovest.

== Later life ==
In his later years, Tshola performed gospel music and worked with artists such as Dr Rebecca Malope. He won many awards including the Metro FM Lifetime Achievement Award and the YoMzansi Lifetime Achievement Award. In 2018, Tshola was honoured with a Commander of the Most Loyal Order of Ramatšeatsana award by His Majesty King Letsie III.

Tshola died on 15 July 2021 at the age of 67 due to complications related to COVID-19. He was laid to rest at the Heroes Acre in Thaba-Bosiu, Lesotho, on 30 July 2021.

== Personal life ==
Tshola was married with two sons, Kamohelo and Katleho. His wife died in 1991 and he never remarried. Both of his sons grew up to become singers.

In the early 2000s, Tshola went public about his drug addiction.

== Awards and honors ==
- Metro FM Lifetime Achievement Award 2016.
- Commander of the Most Loyal Order of Ramatšeatsana award by His Majesty King Letsie III.
- YoMzansi Lifetime Achievement Award
