= Botswana =

Country in Southern Africa

Republic of Botswana Lefatshe la Botswana
- Flag Coat of arms
- Motto: Pula "Rain"
- Anthem: "Fatshe leno la rona" "This Land of Ours"
- Capital and largest city: Gaborone; 24°39.5′S 25°54.5′E
- Official languages: English
- National language: Tswana
- Ethnic groups (2024): 79% Tswana; 11% Kalanga; 3% San; 7% others (Note: Including Kgalagadi, White and Indian.)
- Religion (2022): 86.5% Christianity; 7.1% no religion; 4.6% Badimo; 1.8% others (Note: Including Baháʼí Fatih, Hinduism, and Islam)
- Government: Unitary parliamentary republic with an executive presidency
  - President: Duma Boko
  - Vice-President: Ndaba Gaolathe
  - National Assembly Speaker: Dithapelo Keorapetse
- Legislature: Parliament (National Assembly)

Independence from the United Kingdom
  - Established (Constitution): 30 September 1966

Area
  - Total: 581,730 km^{2} (224,610 sq mi) (47th)
  - Water (%): 2.7

Population
  - 2022 census: 2,359,609 (143rd)
  - Density: 4.1/km^{2} (10.6/sq mi) (231st)
- GDP (PPP): 2026 estimate
  - Total: ▲$54.820 billion (124th)
  - Per capita: ▲$19,540 (83rd)
- GDP (nominal): 2026 estimate
  - Total: ▲$20.710 billion (122nd)
  - Per capita: ▲$7,380 (87th)
- Gini (2016): ▼45.5 medium inequality
- HDI (2023): ▲0.731 high (111th)
- Currency: Pula (BWP)
- Time zone: UTC+2 (Central Africa Time)
- Date format: dd/mm/yyyy
- Calling code: +267
- ISO 3166 code: BW
- Internet TLD: .bw

Tswana
- Person: Motswana
- People: Batswana
- Language: Setswana
- Country: Botswana

Botswana, (Note: /bɒtˈswɑːnə/ bot-SWAH-nə, UK also /bʊtˈswɑːnə, bʊˈtʃwɑːnə/ buut-SWAH-nə, buu-CHWAH-nə;) officially the Republic of Botswana, (Note: Setswana: Lefatshe la Botswana [lɪˈfatsʰɪ la bʊˈtswana].) is a landlocked country in Southern Africa. Botswana is topographically flat, with approximately 70% of its territory being a part of the Kalahari Desert. It is bordered by South Africa to the south and southeast, Namibia to the west and north, Zambia to the north, and Zimbabwe to the northeast. Its total area is 581,730 square kilometres (224,610 sq mi). Gaborone, in the South-East District, is the country's capital and largest city.

Botswana is one of the most sparsely populated countries in the world. While it is not enshrined by statutory law, Botswana is de facto the nation state of the Batswana people, who constitute nearly 80% of the population while legally undistinguished Kalanga people, who account for another 11%, are the single largest ethnic minority.

The Batswana ethnic group are descended mainly from Bantu-speaking peoples who migrated into southern Africa, including modern Botswana, in several waves before AD 600. In 1885, the British colonised the area and declared a protectorate named Bechuanaland. As part of the decolonisation of Africa, Bechuanaland became an independent Commonwealth republic under its current name on 30 September 1966. Since then, it has been a parliamentary republic with a consistent record of uninterrupted democratic elections, though dominated by the Botswana Democratic Party until 2024, when the Umbrella for Democratic Change won the 2024 Botswana general election.

Botswana's economy has generally experienced stable growth since independence. It is dominated by tourism and mining; Botswana produces more diamonds than any other country except Russia. Its gross national income per capita (purchasing power parity) of about $20,158 as of 2024 (by some estimates the fourth-largest in Africa) gives the country a relatively high standard of living and the second-highest Human Development Index of continental sub-Saharan Africa, after South Africa. Despite Botswana’s economic gains, Botswana continues to grapple with high unemployment, severe income inequality, and one of the world's most critical HIV/AIDS epidemics. Botswana is a member of the Southern African Customs Union, the Southern African Development Community, the Commonwealth of Nations and the United Nations.

== Etymology ==
The country's name means "Land of the Tswana", referring to the dominant ethnic group in Botswana. The Constitution of Botswana recognises a homogeneous Tswana state. The demonym Batswana was originally applied to the Tswana, and has also come to be used generally as a term for all citizens of Botswana. In Setswana, Batswana is grammatically plural; its singular form, which can refer to a single member of the Tswana or to a single citizen of Botswana, is Motswana.

== History ==
Present-day Botswana was primarily forest ten million years ago. Homo erectus lived in the region during the Early Stone Age. Stone tools in present-day Botswana date back to two million years ago. Hominin migration to the Kalahari Desert, which includes Botswana, is estimated to have happened prior to 186,000 years ago. Lake Makgadikgadi began to shrink approximately 50,000 years ago. Roughly 30,000–40,000 years ago, the ancestors of the Khoe and the San lived in the region, adapting their movements to changing water and climate conditions. Rock art dates back to approximately 30,000 years ago, and permanent water sources were widely inhabited by 20,000 years ago.

Around 2,000 years ago, people introduced cattle, sheep, pottery, and agriculture. Crops included millet, sorghum, cowpeas, and more. Bantu-speaking peoples migrated into the region between 2,000 and 1,500 years ago; the Kalanga arrived around AD 200 and ancestors of the Tswana around AD 400 who introduced iron and copper tools along with establishing permanent settlements. From the 7th century, trade expanded, connecting Botswana with wider southern Africa and eventually the Indian Ocean trade. The Toutswe people, the Kingdom of Mapungubwe, and later Great Zimbabwe became important regional powers, with cattle and gold playing major economic roles.

From the 15th to 18th centuries, Tswana and Kalanga peoples migrated and formed new political communities. Tswana society became organized into merafe (plural form of morafe), a type of tribal government ruled by chiefs known as dikgosi (plural form of kgosi), while cattle became a major asset to the region.

The Difaqane of the late 18th and early 19th century caused widespread warfare and migration, which strengthened Tswana settlement across present-day Botswana. By the 1840s, many states had been re-established and governed through the kgotla, a traditional community council.

European influence expanded after missionaries arrived in 1816, followed by British traders and explorers. David Livingstone established a mission in 1845, while Christianity and European trade spread. Conflict with Boer forces continued, and the discovery of the Tati Goldfields in 1868 led to a gold rush and the growth of Francistown as a major mining and railway centre.

In 1852, a coalition of Tswana chiefdoms led by Sechele I defeated Afrikaner incursions at the Battle of Dimawe and, after about eight years of intermittent tensions and hostilities, eventually came to a peace agreement in Potchefstroom in 1860. In 1884, Batawana, a northern-based Tswana clan's cavalry under the command of kgosi Moremi II, fought and defeated the Ndebele's invasion of northern Botswana at the Battle of Khutiyabasadi. This was the start of the collapse of the Ndebele kingdom in Zimbabwe, helping Tswana speaking authority.

=== Bechuanaland Protectorate ===
In 1885, Britain established the Bechuanaland Protectorate to prevent German and Afrikaner expansion while maintaining a strategic link between southern and central Africa. Tswana dikgosi supported British protection since they feared settler colonialism by Germany along with incorporation into South Africa and the mining magnate Cecil Rhodes. The protectorate was divided into tribal reserves and British crown land, with eight Tswana groups being recognized. The dikgosi still had considerable authority, while Britain exercised relatively limited direct control, believing the protectorate would be absorbed by a British colony. The territory was economically dependent on South Africa.

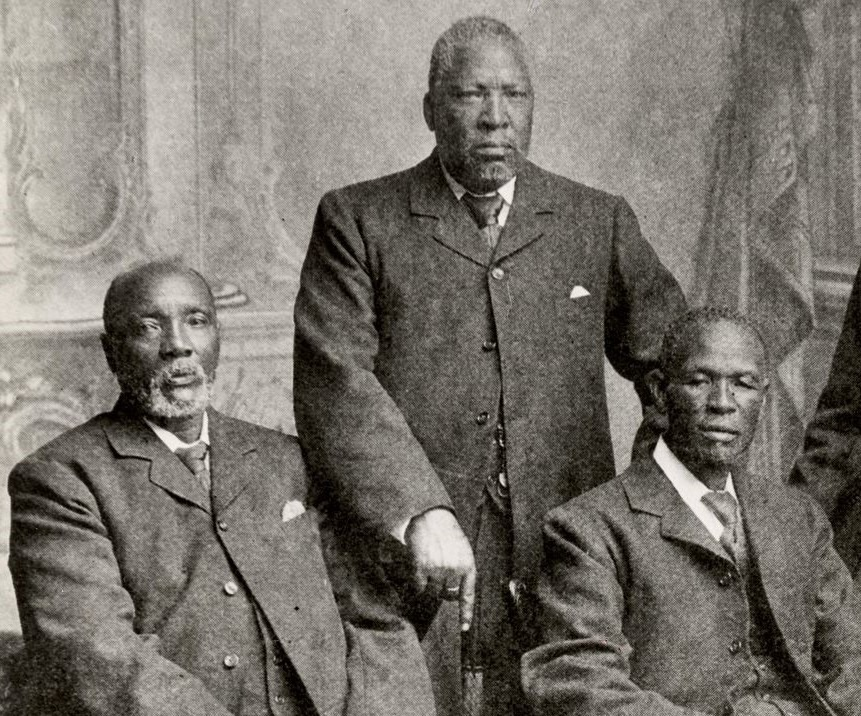
From left to right: Sebele I, Bathoen I and Khama III.

In 1895, Khama III, Sebele I, and Bathoen I travelled to Britain and successfully persuaded the British government not to transfer the protectorate to Cecil Rhodes's British South Africa Company. This mission became an important early example of Tswana political unity.

The protectorate suffered heavily from the rinderpest epidemic of the 1890s, losing livestock and wild game. Britain introduced hut and poll taxes, and the protectorate joined the South African Customs Union in 1910. At this point, all Tswana tribes had adopted Christianity.

During the First World War, hundreds of Batswana served with British forces. British involvement increased during the 1930s, as the administration sought to develop the cattle economy while imposing greater controls on the dikgosi. A severe drought earlier in the decade had killed much of the protectorate's cattle. Bechuanaland sent roughly 11,000 men to serve alongside British forces during the Second World War, with most serving in the British Army's African Auxiliary Pioneer Corps. The war brought shortages, higher prices, taxation, and economic disruption throughout the protectorate; however, relative to other nations in the British Empire, the people of Bechuanaland approved of the war. Following the war; education, wage labour, and civic organizations contributed to the emergence of a new political class that increasingly challenged traditional chiefly authority.

The most important political crisis came from Seretse Khama, heir to the Ngwato chieftainship, whose marriage to the British white woman Ruth Williams caused controversy. In 1950, Britain banished the couple from the protectorate under pressure from South Africa and racial politics surrounding apartheid. Seretse's supporters protested, and he was eventually allowed to return in 1956. The controversy weakened the authority of the chiefs and strengthened the movement toward representative government. Political parties emerged, including the Bechuanaland People's Party in 1960 and Seretse Khama's Bechuanaland Democratic Party (BDP) in 1962. A new system reduced the political power of chiefs while preserving them in a Ntlo ya Dikgosi (House of Chiefs). Gaborone became the capital in 1965, and the protectorate gained self-government. The BDP won the first general election, and on 30 September 1966, the Bechuanaland Protectorate became the independent Republic of Botswana, with Seretse Khama as its first president.

=== Independence–present ===
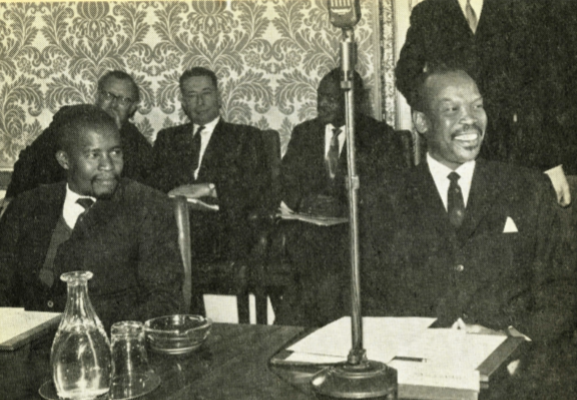
Seretse Khama (right) and Quett Masire (left) at independence talks in London, 1965

Botswana gained independence in 1966 and established a liberal democracy based on elections, human rights, and a Westminster system with Seretse Khama as its first president. Traditional chiefs and institutions such as the kgotla were retained but placed under the national legal system. Botswana was extremely poor at independence, with low literacy, little infrastructure, and an economy heavily dependent on cattle farming and South Africa.

Under Seretse Khama, the government invested in roads, schools, and other public services. The discovery of diamonds in 1967 transformed the economy. Partnerships with De Beers and the creation of Debswana allowed the government to gain substantial diamond revenue, helping Botswana become one of Africa's fastest-growing economies.

After Seretse Khama's death in 1980, then Vice-President of Botswana Quett Masire became the president of Botswana. Quett Masire continued Khama's development policies, preserving faith in the government. Strong opposition of the Botswana Democratic Party started gaining traction in the 1980s, with many opposition parties winning local elections. Previously dependent on support by specific ethnic groups, the Botswana National Front gained support among the working class. By the 1984 general election, it was a competitive opposition party. HIV/AIDS had caused the life expectancy to drop from 67 to 50 years in one decade.

Festus Mogae became president in 1998 when Quett Masire stepped down as President. Mogae continued economic development and made HIV/AIDS treatment a major priority. The Botswana–Namibia border came under dispute in 1999 when both countries claimed the Sedudu Island. The dispute went to the International Court of Justice, where it was ruled that the island belonged to Botswana. The San people issued a legal challenge in 2002 to contest their expulsion from the Central Kalahari Game Reserve, but the case was dismissed.

Ian Khama, the son of Seretse Khama succeeded to the presidency at the end of Mogae's term on 1 April 2008. His style of leadership was advertised as following the "four Ds": democracy, development, dignity, and discipline. Khama centralised power around the presidency. The 2008 financial crisis pressured Botswana's economy, which remained dependent on diamond mines despite the government's efforts. The diamond industry ended a steady decline when it stabilised at about 39% of the nation's GDP in 2009. The BDP retained its majority in the legislature after the 2014 general election, but for the first time it did so with only a plurality of the popular vote. Ian Khama then appointed Masisi as his vice-president. The decision was controversial because of Masisi's inexperience relative to other possible choices.

Following the 2019 general election, Mokgweetsi Masisi was elected president. He reversed several Khama-era policies and pursued anti-corruption measures. In the 2024 Botswana general election, the opposition Umbrella for Democratic Change defeated the Botswana Democratic Party, ending 58 years of BDP rule and making Duma Boko president. His government has emphasized economic diversification, including solar energy and technology, while also confronting a major healthcare crisis caused by shortages of medicines and supplies.

== Geography ==
=== Physical geography ===
Thunderstorms rolling in the Kalahari Desert

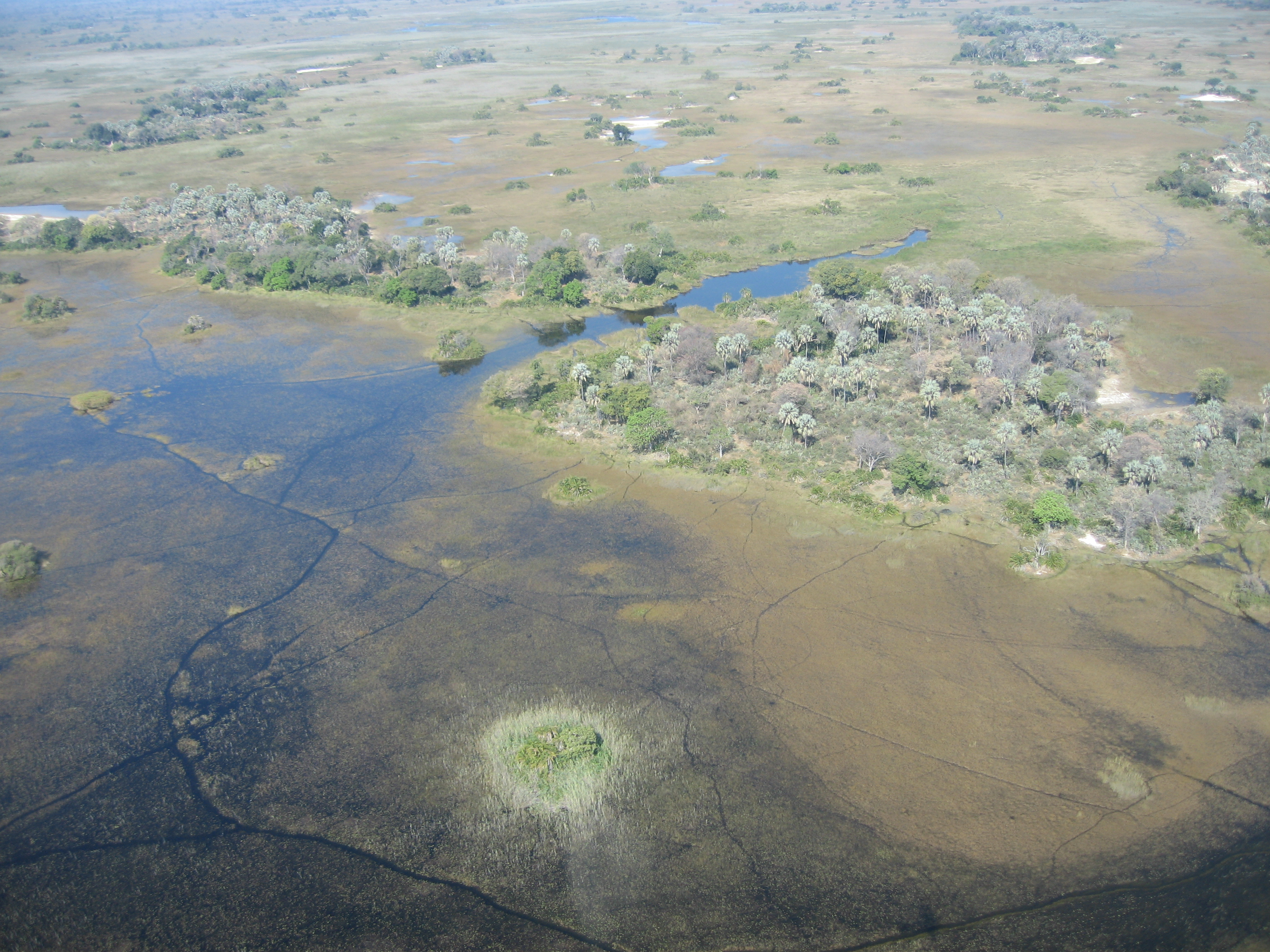
The Okavango Delta is a river delta located in Botswana.

Botswana's geography features a predominantly flat and dry landscape, with much of the country covered by the Kalahari Desert. The country's terrain consists of sandy soils, rocky hill ranges, grasslands, and more. Much of Botswana's population is concentrated in the southeastern part of the country, where major urban centres are located.

Botswana is a landlocked country in southern Africa, bordered by Namibia to the west and north, Zambia to the north, Zimbabwe to the northeast, and South Africa to the south and southeast. Botswana features the Okavango Delta located in the northwest, a vast inland river delta where the Okavango River spreads across the Kalahari rather than flowing into the sea. The delta contains numerous channels, lagoons, islands, and seasonal wetlands and supports wildlife. The Chobe River in the north also forms part of Botswana's border with Namibia and contributes to the region's extensive wetlands.

Botswana's climate is generally semi-arid. Rainfall is highly seasonal and varies considerably across the country. The northern and eastern areas generally receive more rainfall than the dry southwest. Summers can be extremely hot, while winter nights can become quite cold.

Botswana is vulnerable to several natural and environmental hazards. Drought is a recurring environmental challenge and can have significant effects on agriculture, livestock, water supplies, and wildlife. Periods of heavy rainfall can also cause localized flooding, particularly in the Okavango and Chobe regions and along seasonal waterways. Veldfires typically occur during the winter dry season. These fires are either natural, which are triggered by lightning during the rainy season, or unnatural, which are caused by human intervention during the dry season and often prolonged by delayed rainfall.

=== Environment and wildlife ===
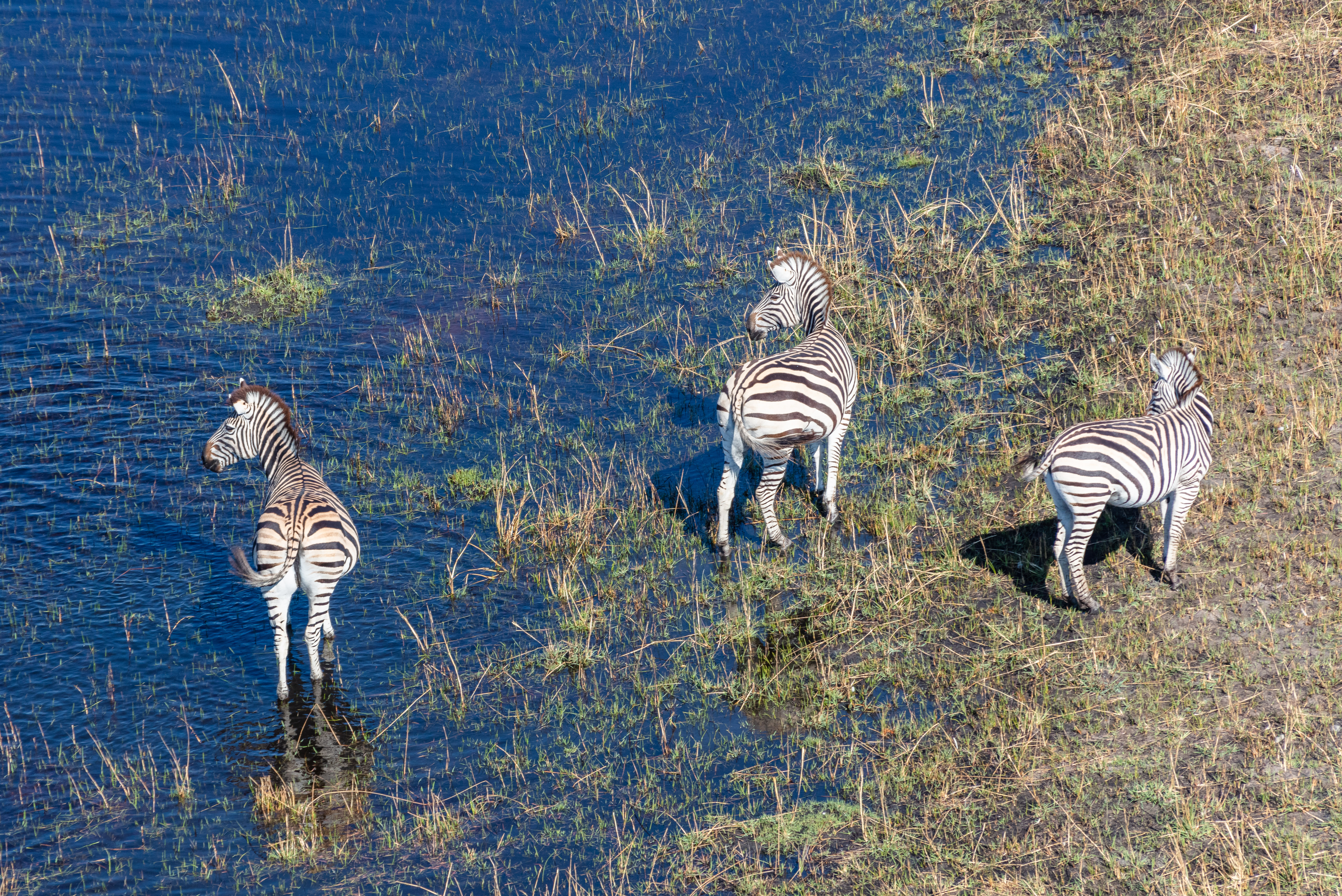
Zebras roaming the Okavango Basin

Botswana has a high biodiversity, particularly in the Okavango Delta, featuring thousands of plant and animal species including mammals, birds, reptiles, amphibians, and fish. However, critical data gaps regarding species distribution and status significantly hinder conservation efforts. The country features many protected areas allowing large areas of natural habitat to remain intact. Botswana has some of the largest and most important wildlife populations in Africa. Wildlife is particularly concentrated in the north since wetlands and savannas in the area provide permanent or seasonal sources of water. Northern Botswana has one of the few remaining large populations of the endangered African wild dog.

Since raising livestock has been profitable for the people of Botswana, land continues to be exploited with dramatically increasing numbers of animals. From 1966 to 1991, the livestock population grew from 1.7 million to 5.5 million. Environmentalists report that the Okavango Delta is drying up due to increased livestock grazing. The Okavango Delta is one of the major semi-forested wetlands in Botswana and one of the largest inland deltas in the world; the ecosystem is crucial to the survival of many animals.

Botswana faces two major environmental problems, drought and desertification, which are heavily linked. Three-quarters of the country's human and animal populations depend on groundwater due to drought. Groundwater use through deep borehole drilling has somewhat eased the effects of drought. Surface water is scarce in Botswana, and less than 5% of the agriculture in the country is sustainable by rainfall. In the remaining 95% of the country, raising livestock is the primary source of rural income. Approximately 71% of the country's land is used for communal grazing, which has been a major cause of the desertification and the accelerating soil erosion in the country.

Botswana had a 2018 Forest Landscape Integrity Index mean score of 9.13/10, ranking it 8th globally out of 172 countries.

== Government and politics ==
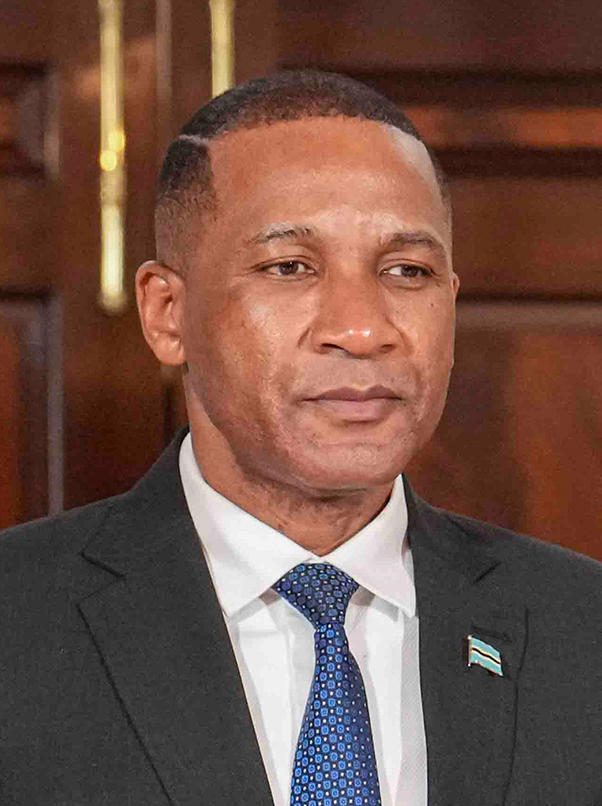
Duma Boko has been the President of Botswana since 2024.

Botswana is a parliamentary republic governed by the Constitution of Botswana. It is the longest uninterrupted democracy in Africa. Its seat of government is in Gaborone. Botswana's governing institutions were established after it became an independent nation in 1966. Botswana's governmental structure is based on both the United Kingdom's Westminster system and the Tswana people's tribal governments. Botswana has a centralised government in which national law supersedes local law. Local laws are developed by local councils and district councils. They are heavily influenced by tribal governments, which are led by the tribe's chief.

The Parliament of Botswana consists of the President and the National Assembly, which serves as the nation's formal and sole legislature, while the Ntlo ya Dikgosi serves an advisory body made up of tribal chiefs and other appointed members. Botswana's executive branch is led by the President of Botswana, who serves as both the head of state and head of government. The members of parliament choose the president, and the president then appoints the vice-president and cabinet members. The president has significant power in Botswana, and the legislature has little power to check the president once appointed. The judiciary includes the High Court of Botswana, the Court of Appeal and Magistrates' Courts. Cases are often settled by customary courts with tribal chiefs presiding.

Elections in Botswana are held every five years and overseen by the Independent Electoral Commission (IEC). Botswana operates a multi-party system in which many political parties compete in elections. It was a dominant-party state in which the Botswana Democratic Party had ruled with a majority government from independence in 1966 to 2024. The nation's elections are recognised as free and fair, but the ruling party has institutional advantages that other parties do not. Factionalism is common within Botswana's political parties, and several groups have formed new parties by splitting from established ones. Since 2019, the Umbrella for Democratic Change has operated as a coalition of opposition parties. The most recent election was held in 2024, with the Botswana Democratic Party losing its majority for the first time in history, ending its 58-year rule over the country. The election saw Duma Boko being elected as president.

In Botswana's early years, its politics were managed by President Seretse Khama and vice-president (later president) Quett Masire. Since the Kgabo Commission in 1991, factionalism and political rivalries have dominated Botswana politics. The Barata-Phathi faction was led by Peter Mmusi, Daniel Kwelagobe and Ponatshego Kedikilwe, while the A Team faction was led by Mompati Merafhe and Jacob Nkate. When Festus Mogae and Ian Khama became president and vice-president, respectively, they aligned with the A Team. Khama effectively expelled the A Team from the party in 2010 after he became president. A new rivalry formed in 2018 when Khama's chosen successor, Mokgweetsi Masisi, became president. He opposed Khama, and the two formed a political rivalry that continues to loom over Botswana politics in the 2020s.

Botswana was ranked as a "flawed democracy" and 33rd out of 167 states in the 2023 Democracy Index (The Economist), which was the second-highest rating in Africa, and the highest ranking in continental Africa (only the offshore island nation of Mauritius bested its ranking). However, according to the 2024 V-Dem Democracy Indices, Botswana has been experiencing an episode of democratic backsliding over the past 10 years, recording its lowest ever score on the indices.

The 2025 Transparency International Corruption Perceptions Index ranked Botswana as the third-least corrupt country in Africa, just below Cape Verde and the Seychelles.

=== Foreign relations and military ===
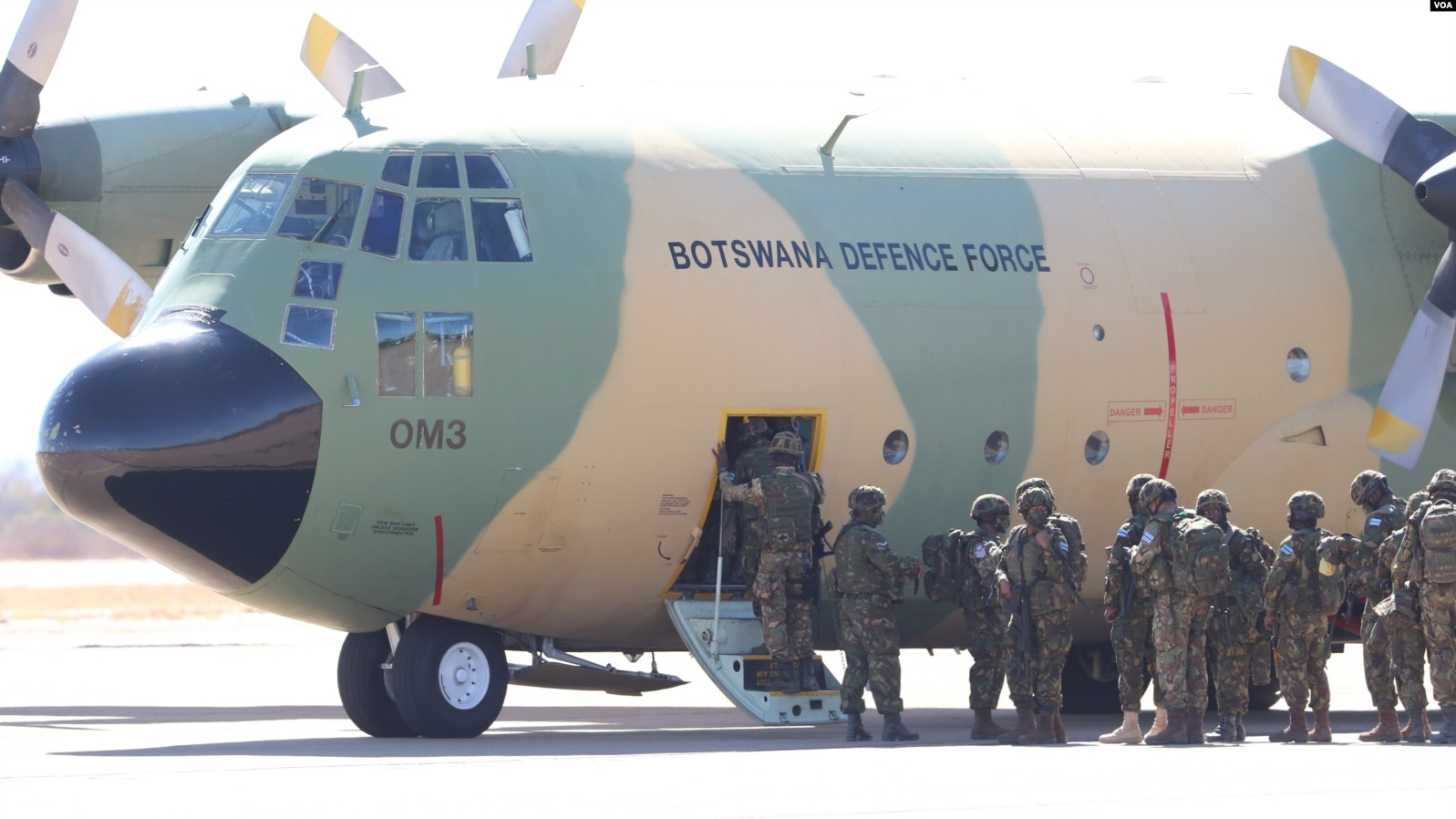
Botswana Defence Force troops deployment to Mozambique in July 2021 to combat the looming threat of terrorism.

At the time of independence, Botswana had no armed forces. It was only after the Rhodesian and South African armies attacked the Zimbabwe People's Revolutionary Army and Umkhonto we Sizwe bases respectively that the Botswana Defence Force (BDF) was formed in 1977. The president is commander-in-chief of the armed forces and appoints a defence council. In 2019, Botswana signed the UN treaty on the Prohibition of Nuclear Weapons.

Following political changes in South Africa and the region, the BDF's missions have increasingly focused on preventing poaching, preparing for disasters, and supporting foreign peacekeeping. The United States has been the largest single foreign contributor to the development of the BDF, and a large segment of its officer corps have received US training. The Botswana government gave the United States permission to explore the possibility of establishing an Africa Command (AFRICOM) base in the country.

Botswana is the 50th most peaceful country in the world, according to the 2024 Global Peace Index. Botswana is a member of the Commonwealth of Nations.

=== Human rights ===
Freedom House considers Botswana to be free with a score of 72/100 in its 2022 Freedom in the World report. It scored high in political rights, though Freedom House expressed concerns regarding the representation of women and minorities and the lack of freedom of information laws. It also scored high in civil rights, though Freedom House expressed concerns regarding freedom of the press and the right to strike. Transparency International has regularly recognised Botswana as the least corrupt country in Africa, and it is often described as comparable to the liberal democracies of Western Europe. One potential issues for human rights in Botswana is the lack of strong checks and balances in the government, which allows the president to exercise wide latitude over policy and arbitrarily curtail free speech. Early focus on public works projects after Botswana's independence rather than militarisation is credited for early legitimacy of the government, permitting stability in the nation's politics.

Conceptions of human rights in Botswana are shaped by collectivist traditions such as botho philosophy rather than individualist traditions. Confrontational approaches to human rights such as protest, strike action and public condemnation are often seen as uncivil foreign inventions. Activism in Botswana instead focuses mainly on providing goods and services to those in need. Human rights Non-governmental organisations are relatively uncommon in Botswana. Among the most active is the Botswana Network on Ethics, Law and HIV/AIDS, which emphasises response to HIV but also addresses other areas such as the rights of women, children and LGBT people.

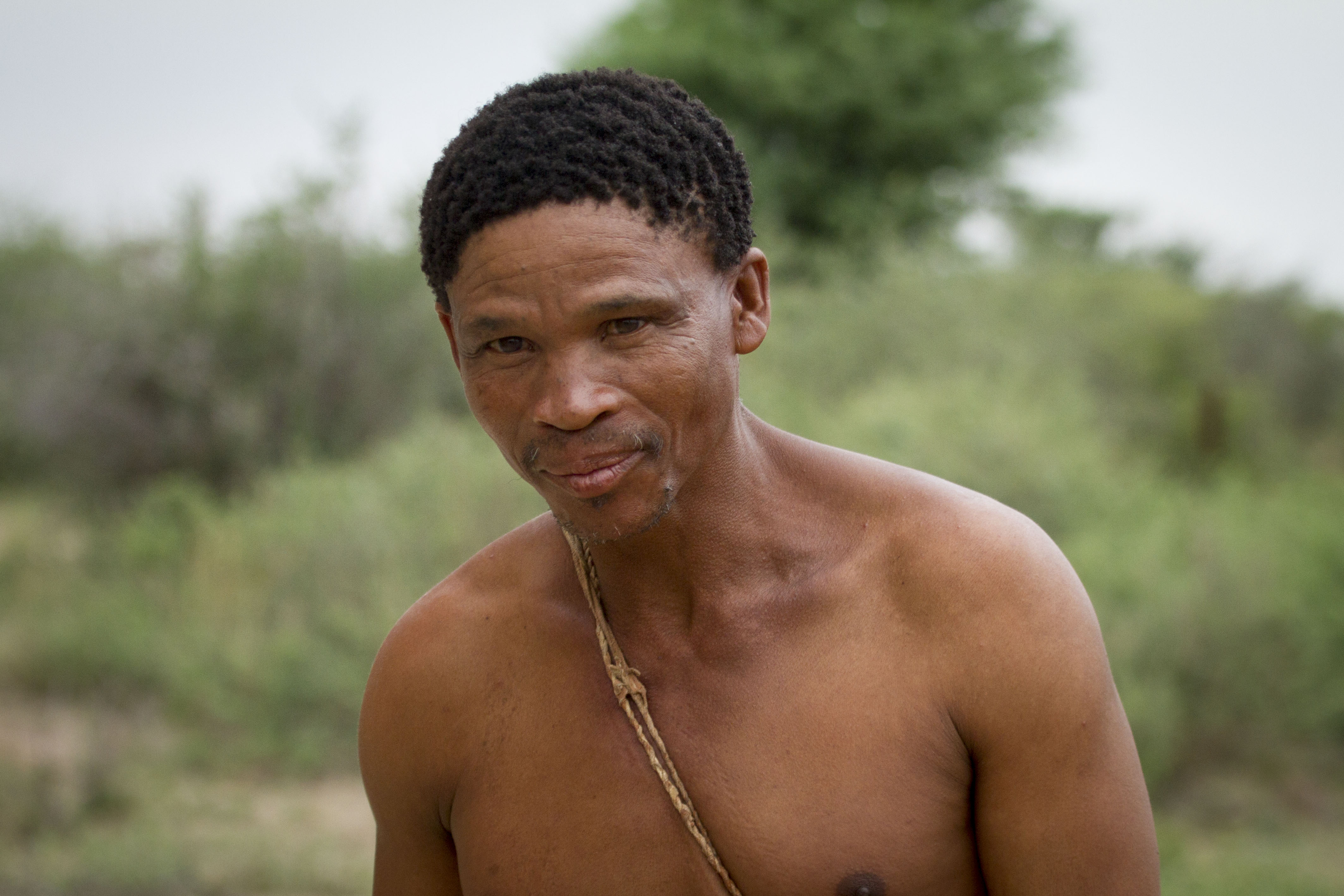
A san man

==== San and other indigenous tribes ====
Many of the indigenous San people have been forcibly relocated from their land to reservations. To make them relocate, they were denied access to water on their land and faced arrest if they hunted, which was their primary source of food. Their lands lie in the middle of the world's richest diamond field. Officially, the government denies that there is any link to mining, claiming the relocation is to preserve the wildlife and ecosystem, even though the San people have lived sustainably on the land for millennia. On the reservations, they struggle to find employment, and alcoholism is rampant.The San are relatively numerous with around 73,586 as of 2024.

However, there are two much smaller indigenous minorities: The Nama; 3271, and the Balala; 2661 as of 2024.

The Balala are said to be descendants of the short indigenous bushmen, inter-married with taller, darker skinned African tribes. Their nomadic traditions and dialect were thought, in the 70's, to date back to antiquity. They were noted for their hunting techniques, including the use of poisoned arrows to hunt springbok. Their womenfolk would gather edible roots, bulbs, tubers, seeds and berries back to their dome shaped huts, where the meat was cooked, after dark, on a camp fire. Puff adder flesh supplied by younger men supplemented the main feast. Thus, snake venom could be used, alongside toxic berries, to produce the hunting poison. Today (2024), these people live, for the most part, below the poverty line.

On 24 August 2018, the UN Special Rapporteur on Minorities, Fernand de Varennes, issued a statement calling on Botswana "to step up efforts to recognise and protect the rights of minorities in relation to public services, land and resource use, and the use of minority languages in education and other critical areas."

=== Administrative divisions ===
Botswana is divided into ten administrative districts. They are Southern District, South-East District, Kweneng District, Kgatleng District, Central District, North-East District, Chobe District, North-West District, Ghanzi District, and Kgalagadi District. There are also seven urban districts; Gaborone, Francistown, Lobatse, Selebi-Phikwe, Orapa, Jwaneng, and Sowa. There are 22 sub-districts. Each district is under the jurisdiction of a district administration, led by a district commissioner.

In 1966, Botswana established the North-West District by merging the Ngamiland and Chobe regions under a single council. This structure remained intact until 2006, when the government officially de-merged the territories, re-establishing Chobe as an independent administrative district.

== Economy ==
GDP per capita of Botswana, 1950 to 2018

Since independence, Botswana has had one of the fastest growth rates in per capita income in the world. Formerly one of the world's poorest countries—with a GDP per capita of about US$70 per year in the late 1960s—Botswana has transformed itself into an upper middle-income country. GDP per capita grew from $439 in 1950 to $15,842 in 2018. Although Botswana was resource-abundant, a good institutional framework allowed the country to reinvest resource-income to generate stable future income. By one estimate, it has the fourth-highest gross national income at purchasing power parity in Africa, giving it a relatively high standard of living in Africa, around that of Mexico. As of 2022, the unemployment rate stood at 25.4%, while youth unemployment reached 45.41% in 2023. The latest available data from 2015/2016 estimate that 17.2% of Botswana's population is multidimensionally poor, with an additional 19.7% at risk.

The Ministry of Trade and Industry of Botswana is responsible for promoting business development throughout the country. According to the International Monetary Fund, economic growth averaged over 9% per year from 1966 to 1999. Botswana has a high level of economic freedom compared to other African countries. The government has maintained a sound fiscal policy, despite consecutive budget deficits in 2002 and 2003, and a negligible level of foreign debt. It earned the highest sovereign credit rating in Africa and has stockpiled foreign exchange reserves (over $7 billion in 2005/2006) amounting to almost two and a half years of current imports.

The constitution provides for an independent judiciary, and the government respects this in practice. The legal system is sufficient to conduct secure commercial dealings, although a growing backlog of cases prevents timely trials. Botswana is ranked second only to South Africa among sub-Saharan African countries in the 2014 International Property Rights Index.

=== Gemstones and precious metals ===
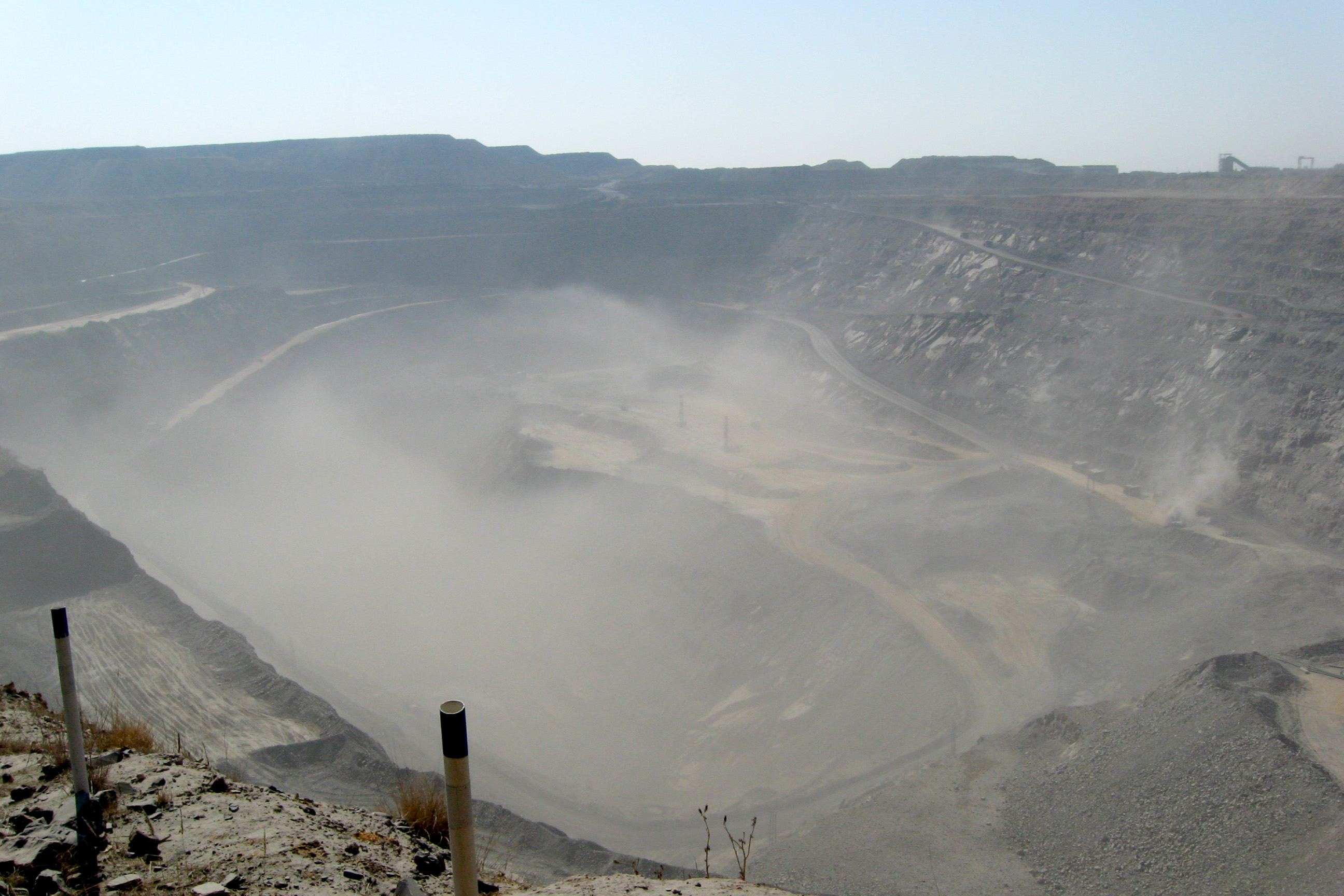
The Jwaneng diamond mine, richest in the world

In Botswana, the Department of Mines and Mineral Resources, Green Technology and Energy Security maintains data regarding mining throughout the country. Debswana, the largest diamond mining company operating in Botswana, is a joint venture, 50% owned by the government.

The mineral industry provides about 40% of all government revenues. Botswana has not begun mining uranium; however, the Letlhakane Uranium Project in Africa is one of the largest undeveloped uranium projects. The government announced in early 2009 that they would try to diversify their economy and avoid overreliance on diamonds.

=== Tourism ===
The Botswana Tourism Organisation is the country's official tourism group. Other destinations in Botswana include the Gaborone Yacht Club and the Kalahari Fishing Club. The country has natural attractions such as the Gaborone Dam and Mokolodi Nature Reserve. There are golf courses that the Botswana Golf Union (BGU) maintains. In 2014, the Okavango Delta of Botswana, the largest inland delta in the world, was inscribed as the 1,000th World Heritage Site.

=== Infrastructure ===
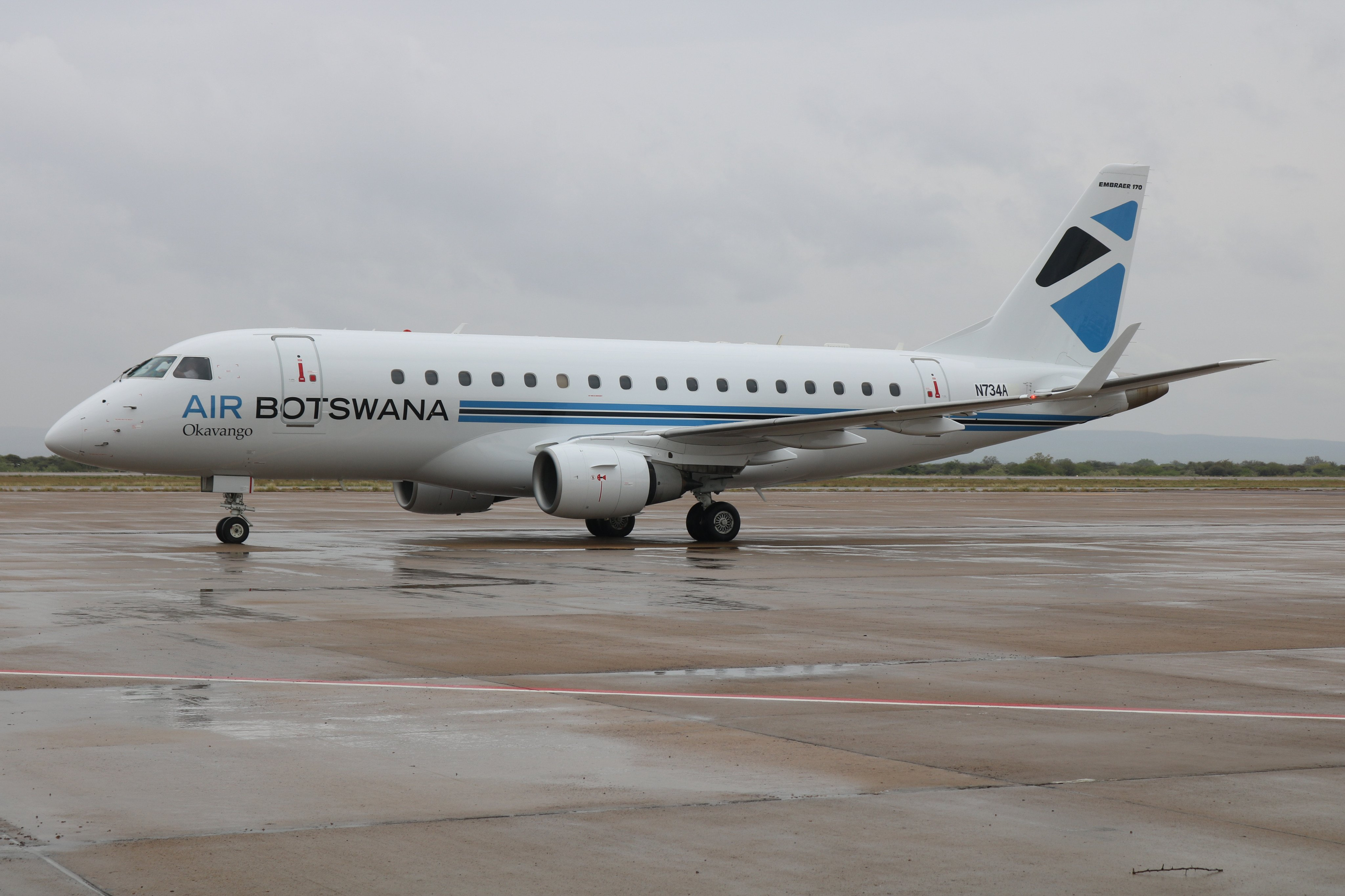

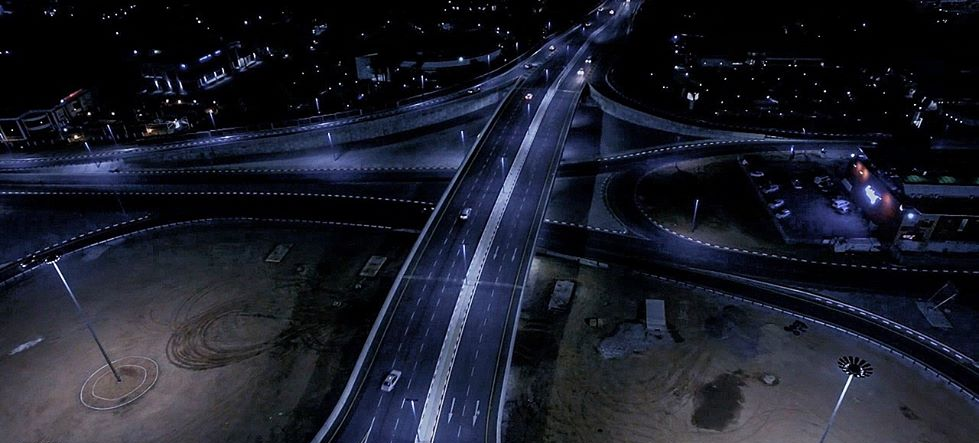
Air Botswana's Embraer E170 (top) and Thapama Interchange in Francistown (bottom)

Botswana has 971 kilometres (603 mi) of railway lines, 18,443.8 kilometres (11,460.4 mi) of roads, and 92 airports, of which 12 have paved runways. Of these roads, 7,383.2 kilometres (4,587.7 mi) are paved, while the other 11,060.6 kilometres (6,872.7 mi) are unpaved. The national airline is Air Botswana, which flies domestically and to other countries in Africa. Botswana Railways is the national railway company, operating primarily in the Southern African regional railway system. Botswana Railways offers rail-based transport facilities for moving a range of commodities for the mining sector and primary materials industries, as well as passenger train services and dry ports.

In terms of power infrastructure in Botswana, the country produces coal for electricity and imports oil. Recently, the country has taken a large interest in renewable energy sources and has designed a comprehensive strategy to attract investors in the wind, solar and biomass renewable energy industries. Botswana's power stations include Morupule B Power Station (600 MW), Morupule A Power Station (132 MW), Orapa Power Station (90 MW), Phakalane Power Station (1.3 MW) and Mmamabula Power Station (300 MW), which is expected to be online in the near future. A 200-MW solar power plant is in the planning and design stage at the Ministry of Mineral Resources, Green Technology and Energy Security.

== Demographics ==
As of 2024, the Tswana are the majority ethnic group in Botswana, making up approximately 79% of the population, followed by Kalanga at 11% and the San (Basarwa) at 3%. The remaining 7% consists of White Batswana/European Batswana, Indians, and a number of other smaller Southern African ethnic groups.

Native groups include the Bayei, Bambukushu, Basubia, Baherero and Bakgalagadi. The Indian minority is made up of both recent migrants and descendants of Indian migrants who arrived from Mozambique, Kenya, Tanzania, Mauritius and South Africa.

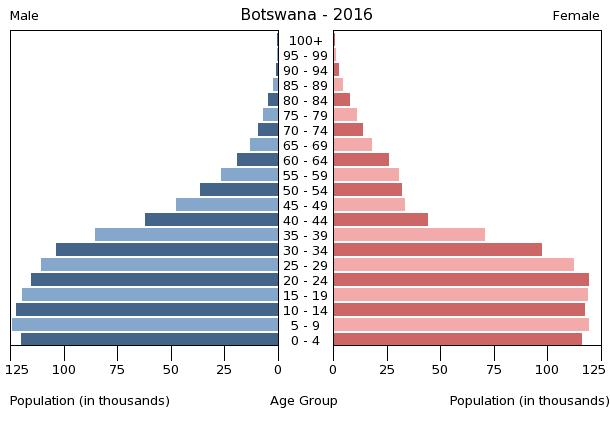
Population pyramid of Botswana, 2016

Since 2000, because of deteriorating economic conditions in Zimbabwe, the number of Zimbabweans in Botswana has risen into the tens of thousands. Fewer than 10,000 San people are still living their traditional hunter-gatherer way of life. Since the mid-1990s, the central government of Botswana has been trying to move the San out of their historic lands, likely because they live in a diamond-rich region.

In 2010, James Anaya, as the Special Rapporteur on the situation of human rights and fundamental freedoms of indigenous people for the United Nations, described loss of land as a major contributor to many of the problems facing Botswana's indigenous people, citing the San's eviction from the Central Kalahari Game Reserve (CKGR) as a special example. Among Anaya's recommendations in a report to the United Nations Human Rights Council was that development programmes should promote, in consultation with indigenous communities such as the San and Bakgalagadi people, activities in harmony with the culture of those communities such as traditional hunting and gathering activities.

Largest cities or towns in Botswana Census Botswana 2022
Rank	Name	District	Pop.	Rank	Name	District	Pop.
1	Gaborone	South-East	246,325	11	Kanye	Southern	48,028
2	Francistown	North-East	103,417	12	Selibe Phikwe	Central	42,488
3	Mogoditshane	Kweneng	88,006	13	Letlhakane	Central	36,338
4	Maun	North-West	84,993	14	Ramotswa	South-East	33,271
5	Molepolole	Kweneng	74,674	15	Lobatse	South-East	29,772
6	Serowe	Central	55,676	16	Mmopane	Kweneng	25,345
7	Tlokweng	South-East	55,508	17	Thamaga	Kweneng	25,297
8	Palapye	Central	52,636	18	Moshupa	Southern	23,858
9	Mochudi	Kgatleng	50,317	19	Tonota	Central	23,296
10	Mahalapye	Central	48,431	20	Bobonong	Central	21,216

=== Languages ===
The official language of Botswana is English, while Setswana is widely spoken across the country. In Setswana, prefixes are more important than they are in many other languages, because Setswana is a Bantu language and has noun classes denoted by these prefixes. They include Bo, which refers to the country, Ba, which refers to the people, Mo, which is one person, and Se which is the language. For example, the main ethnic group of Botswana is the Tswana people, hence the name Botswana for its country. The people as a whole are Batswana, one person is a Motswana, and the language they speak is Setswana. Other languages spoken in Botswana include Kalanga (Sekalanga), Sarwa (Sesarwa), Ndebele, Kgalagadi, Tswapong, Taa, Yeyi, and, in some parts, Afrikaans.

=== Religion ===
Religion in Botswana (Pew Research)
Religion	Per cent
Protestant	66%
No religion	20%
Catholic	7%
Folk	6%
Other	1%

An estimated 77% of the country's citizens identify as Christians. Anglicans, Methodists, and the United Congregational Church of Southern Africa make up the majority of Christian denominations. The country also has congregations of:

- Lutheranism
- Baptism
- Catholic Church
- The Church of Jesus Christ of Latter-day Saints
- The Dutch Reformed Church
- Mennonites
- Seventh-day Adventists
- Jehovah's Witnesses
- Serbian Orthodox Church

According to the 2001 census, the nation has around 5,000 Muslims (mainly from South Asia), 3,000 Hindus, and 700 of the Baháʼí Faith. Approximately 20% of citizens identify with no religion.

=== Health ===
Botswana's healthcare system has been steadily improving and expanding. Specifically, infant mortality and maternal mortality rates are steadily declining. Eighty-five per cent of the population live within a five-kilometre (3.1 mi) radius of a health facility. Seventy-three per cent of pregnant women access antenatal care services at least four times. Almost 100 per cent of births in Botswana take place in hospitals.

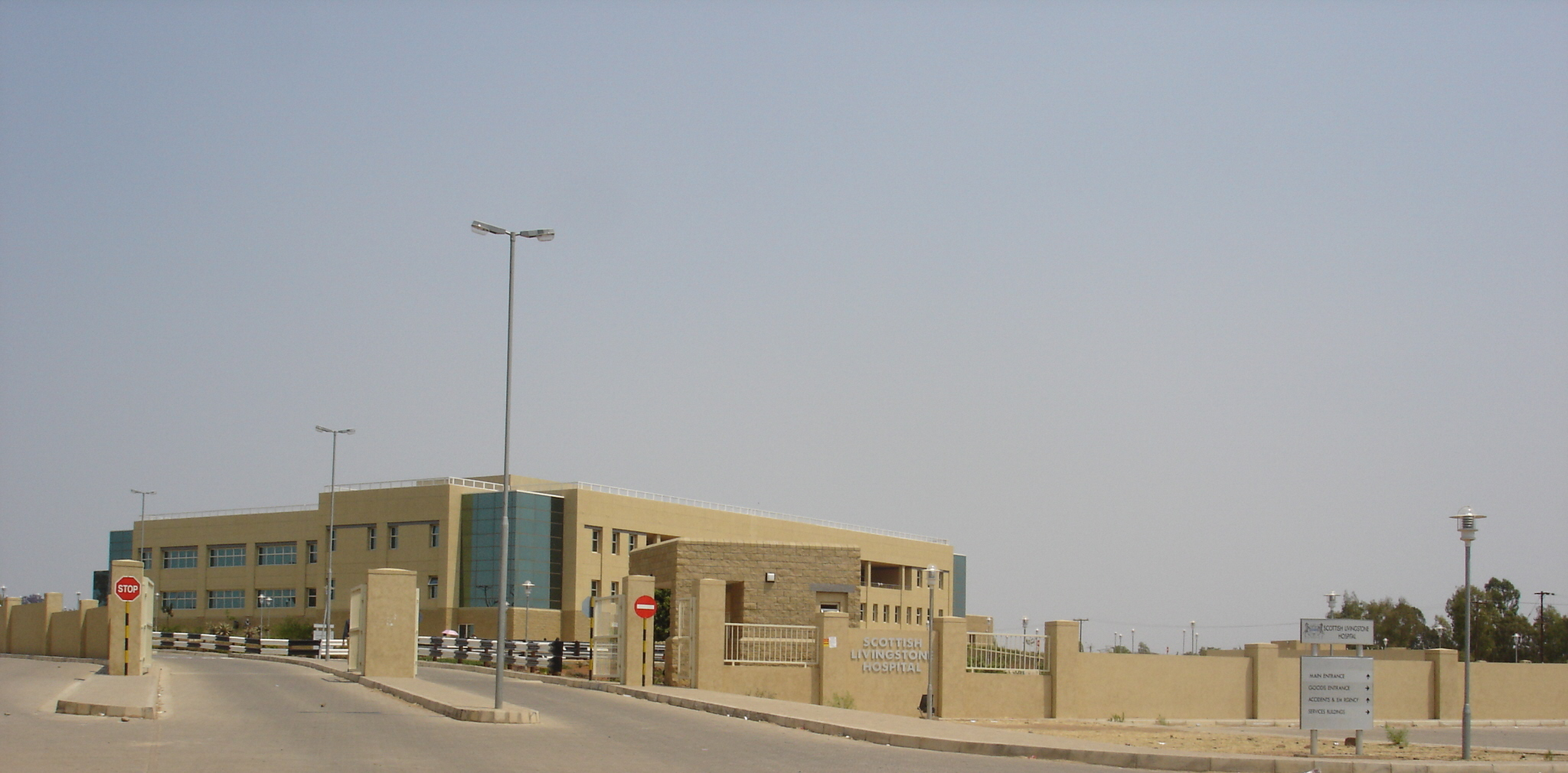
Scottish Livingstone Hospital in Molepolole

The Ministry of Health in Botswana is responsible for overseeing the quality and distribution of healthcare throughout the country. Life expectancy at birth was 55 in 2009 according to the World Bank, having previously fallen from a peak of 64.1 in 1990 to a low of 49 in 2002. Since Botswana's 2011 census, current life expectancy is estimated at 54.06 years.

The Cancer Association of Botswana is a voluntary non-governmental organisation that is a member of the Union for International Cancer Control. The Association supplements existing services through provision of cancer prevention and health awareness programs, facilitating access to health services for cancer patients and offering support and counselling to those affected. Botswana's 2024 Global Hunger Index (GHI) score is 20.7.

==== HIV/AIDS epidemic ====
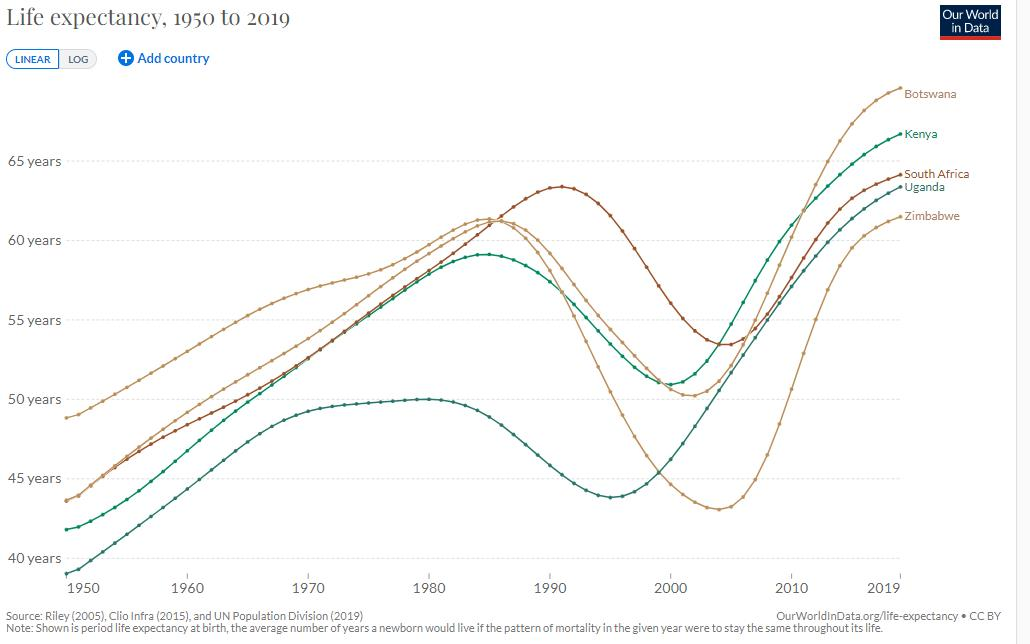
Life expectancy in select Southern African countries, 1950–2019. HIV/AIDS has caused a decline in life expectancy.

Like elsewhere in Sub-Saharan Africa, the economic impact of AIDS is considerable. Economic development spending was cut by 10% in 2002–2003 as a result of recurring budget deficits and rising expenditures on healthcare services. Botswana has been hit very hard by the AIDS pandemic; in 2006, it was estimated that life expectancy at birth had dropped from 65 to 35 years. The life expectancy is 66.4 years as of 2024.

In 2003, the government began a comprehensive programme involving free or cheap generic antiretroviral drugs as well as an information campaign designed to stop the spread of the virus; in 2013, over 40% of adults in Botswana had access to antiretroviral therapy. In the 15–19 age group, prevalence was estimated at 6% for females and 3.5% for males in 2013, and for the 20–24 age group, 15% for females and 5% for males. Botswana is one of 21 priority countries identified by the UN AIDS group in 2011 in the Global Plan to eliminate new HIV infections among children and to keep their mothers alive. From 2009 to 2013, the country saw a decrease of over 50% in new HIV infections in children. Less than 10% of pregnant HIV-infected women were not receiving antiretroviral medications in 2013, with a large, corresponding decrease (over 50%) in the number of new HIV infections in children under five. Among the UN Global Plan countries, people living with HIV in Botswana have the highest percentage receiving antiretroviral treatment: about 75% for adults (age 15+) and about 98% for children.

The country has been adversely affected by the HIV/AIDS epidemic. In 2002, Botswana became the first country to offer anti-retroviral drugs (ARVs) to help combat the epidemic. Despite the launch of programmes to make treatment available and to educate the populace about the epidemic, the number of people with AIDS rose from 290,000 in 2005 to 320,000 in 2013. However, in recent years, the country has made strides in combating HIV/AIDS, with efforts being made to provide proper treatment and lower the rate of mother-to-child transmission.

With a nationwide Prevention of Mother-to-Child Transmission programme, Botswana has reduced HIV transmission from infected mothers to their children from about 40% in 2003 to 4% in 2010. Under the leadership of Festus Mogae, the government of Botswana solicited outside help in curing people with HIV/AIDS and received early support from the Bill and Melinda Gates Foundation and the Merck Foundation, which together formed the African Comprehensive HIV/AIDS Partnership (ACHAP). Other early partners include the Botswana–Harvard AIDS Institute of the Harvard School of Public Health and the Botswana–UPenn Partnership of the University of Pennsylvania. According to the 2011 UNAIDS Report, universal access to treatment—defined as 80% coverage or greater—has been achieved in Botswana.

== Culture ==
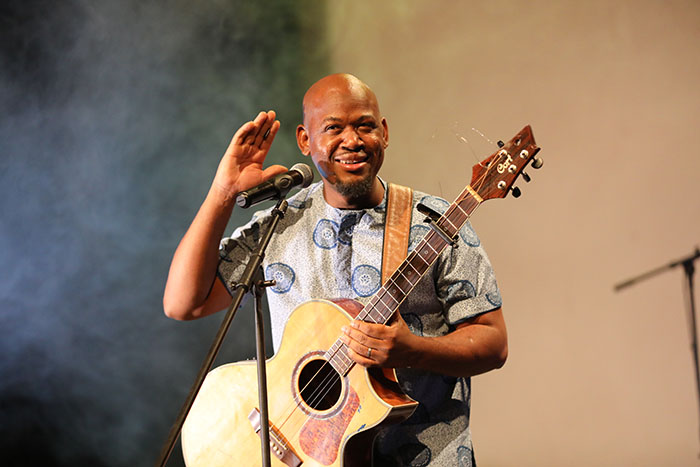

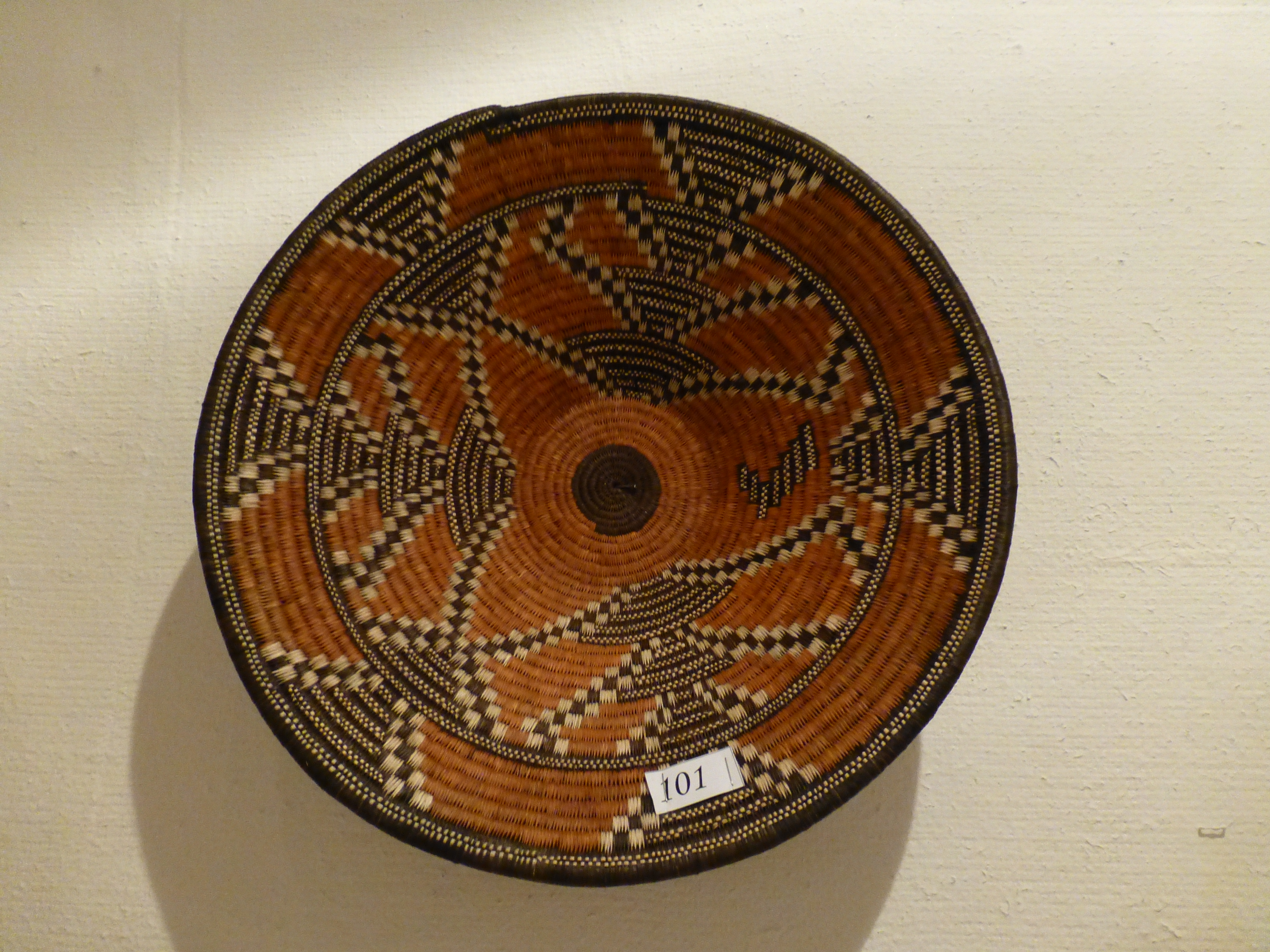
Folklore musician Sereetsi (top) and traditional basket (bottom)

Botswana's music is mostly vocal and performed, sometimes without drums depending on the occasion; it also makes heavy use of string instruments. Botswana folk music has instruments such as setinkane (a sort of miniature piano), segankure/segaba (a Motswana version of the Chinese instrument erhu), moropa (meropa for plural) and phala (a whistle used mostly during celebrations). The hands are sometimes used as musical instruments too, by either clapping them together or against phathisi (goat skin turned inside out wrapped around the calf area, only used by men) to create music and rhythm. The national anthem is "Fatshe leno la rona", which was written and composed by Kgalemang Tumediso Motsete; it was adopted upon independence in 1966.

In the northern part of Botswana, women in the villages of Etsha and Gumare are noted for their skill at crafting baskets from mokola palm and local dyes. The baskets are generally woven into three types: large, lidded baskets used for storage; large, open baskets for carrying objects on the head or for winnowing threshed grain; and smaller plates for winnowing pounded grain. These baskets steadily use colour.

The oldest paintings from both Botswana and South Africa depict hunting, animal and human figures, and were made by the Khoisan (Kung San/Bushmen) over 20,000 years ago within the Kalahari Desert.

=== Cuisine ===
The national dish is seswaa, pounded meat made from goat meat or beef, or Segwapa dried, cured meat ranging from beef to game meats, either fillets of meat cut into strips following the grain of the muscle, or flat pieces sliced across the grain. Botswana's cuisine shares some characteristics with other cuisine of southern Africa.

Examples of Botswana food are: bogobe, pap (maize porridge), boerewors, samp, Magwinya and mopane worms. Bogobe is made by putting sorghum, maize or millet flour into boiling water, stirring it into a soft paste, and cooking it slowly. A dish called ting is made when milk and sugar is added to fermented sorghum or maize. Ting without the milk and sugar is sometimes eaten with meat or vegetables for lunch or dinner. Another way of making bogobe is to add sour milk and a cooking melon (lerotse). The Kalanga tribe calls this dish tophi. Madila is a traditional fermented milk product similar to yogurt or sour cream.

=== Sports ===
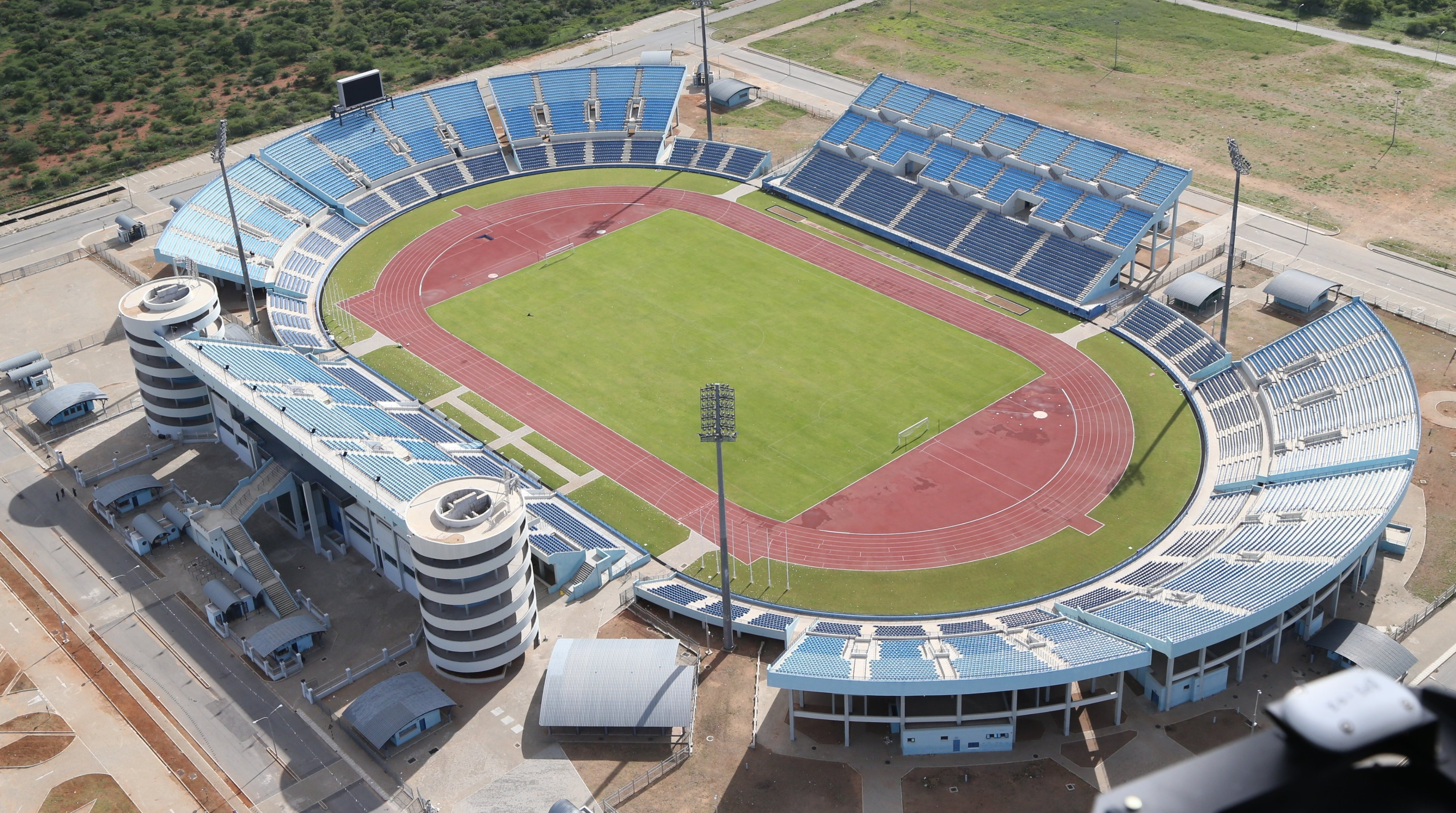
Obed Itani Chilume Stadium

Football is the most popular sport in Botswana. Qualifying for the 2012 and 2025 Africa Cup of Nations are the national team's highest achievement to date. Other popular sports are softball, cricket, tennis, rugby, badminton, handball, golf and track and field. Botswana is an associate member of the International Cricket Council. Botswana became a member of the International Badminton Federation and Africa Badminton Federation in 1991. The Botswana Golf Union has an amateur golf league in which golfers compete in tournaments and championships. Runner Nijel Amos won Botswana its first Olympic medal in 2012, taking silver in the 800 metres.

In 2011, Amantle Montsho became world champion in the 400 metres and won Botswana's first athletics medal at the world level. High jumper Kabelo Kgosiemang is a three-time African champion. Isaac Makwala is a sprinter who specialises in the 400 metres who was the gold medalist at the Commonwealth Games in 2018. Baboloki Thebe was a silver medalist in the 200 metres at the 2014 Summer Youth Olympics and reached the semi-finals at the 2014 World Junior Championships in Athletics. Ross Branch Ross, a motor-biker, holds the number one place in the South African Cross Country Championship and has competed at the Dakar Rally. Letsile Tebogo set the world junior record in the 100 metres with a time of 9.94 at the 2022 World Athletics Championships, and, as of 2024, holds the 100-metre and 300-metre world's third-best time of 30.69 seconds. On 7 August 2021, Botswana won the bronze medal in the Men's 4 × 400 metres relay at the Olympics in Tokyo. Botswana was the first African nation to host the Netball World Youth Cup. On 8 August 2024, Letsile Tebogo won Botswana's first-ever Olympic gold medal at the 2024 Paris Olympics after finishing in first place in the men's 200m final, finishing with a time of 19.46 seconds.

The card game bridge has a strong following; it was first played in Botswana around 40 years ago, and it grew in popularity during the 1980s. Many British expatriate school teachers informally taught the game in Botswana's secondary schools. The Botswana Bridge Federation (BBF) was founded in 1988. Bridge has remained popular and the BBF has over 800 members. In 2007, the BBF invited the English Bridge Union to host a week-long teaching programme in May 2008.

== Education ==
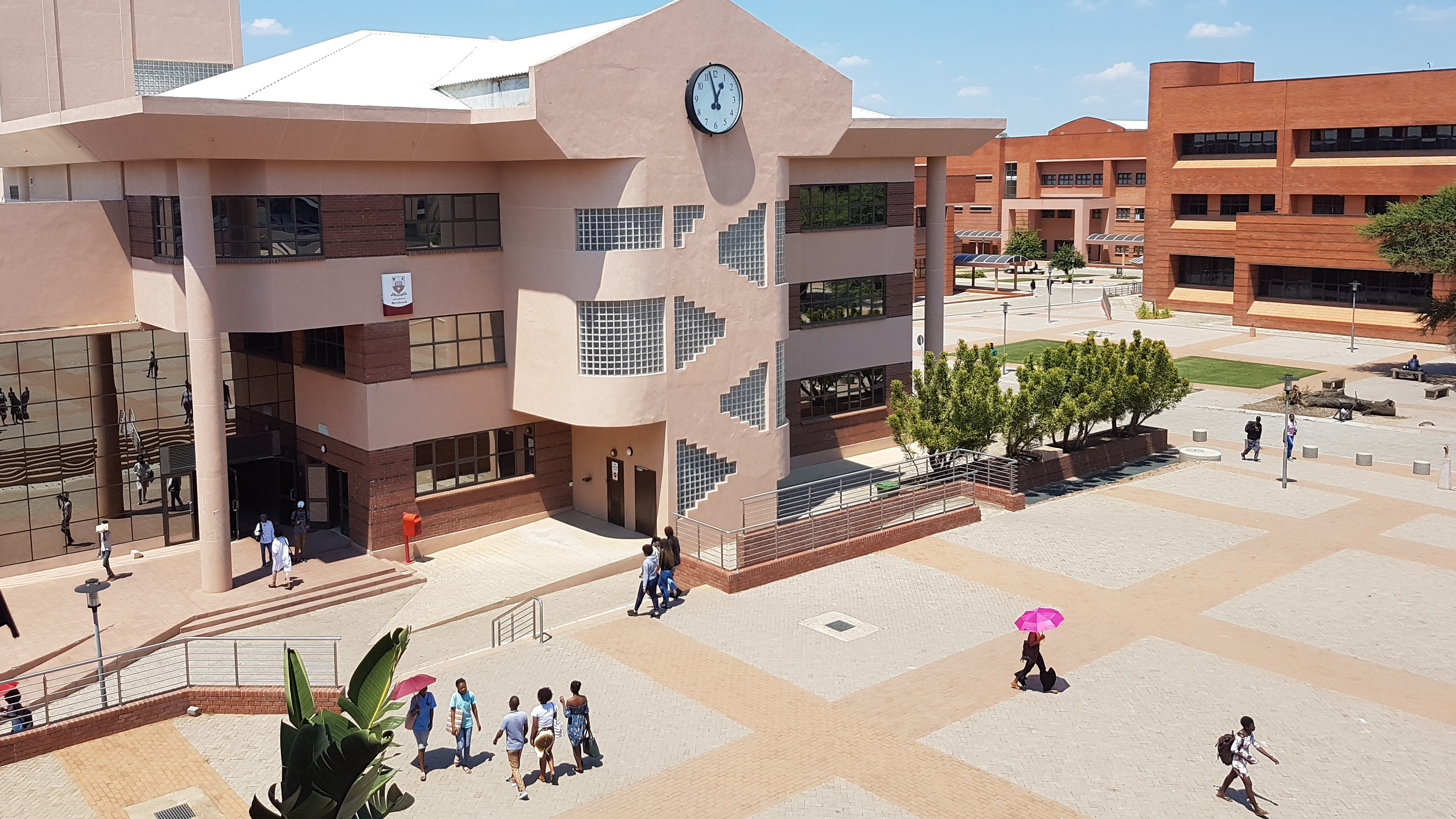

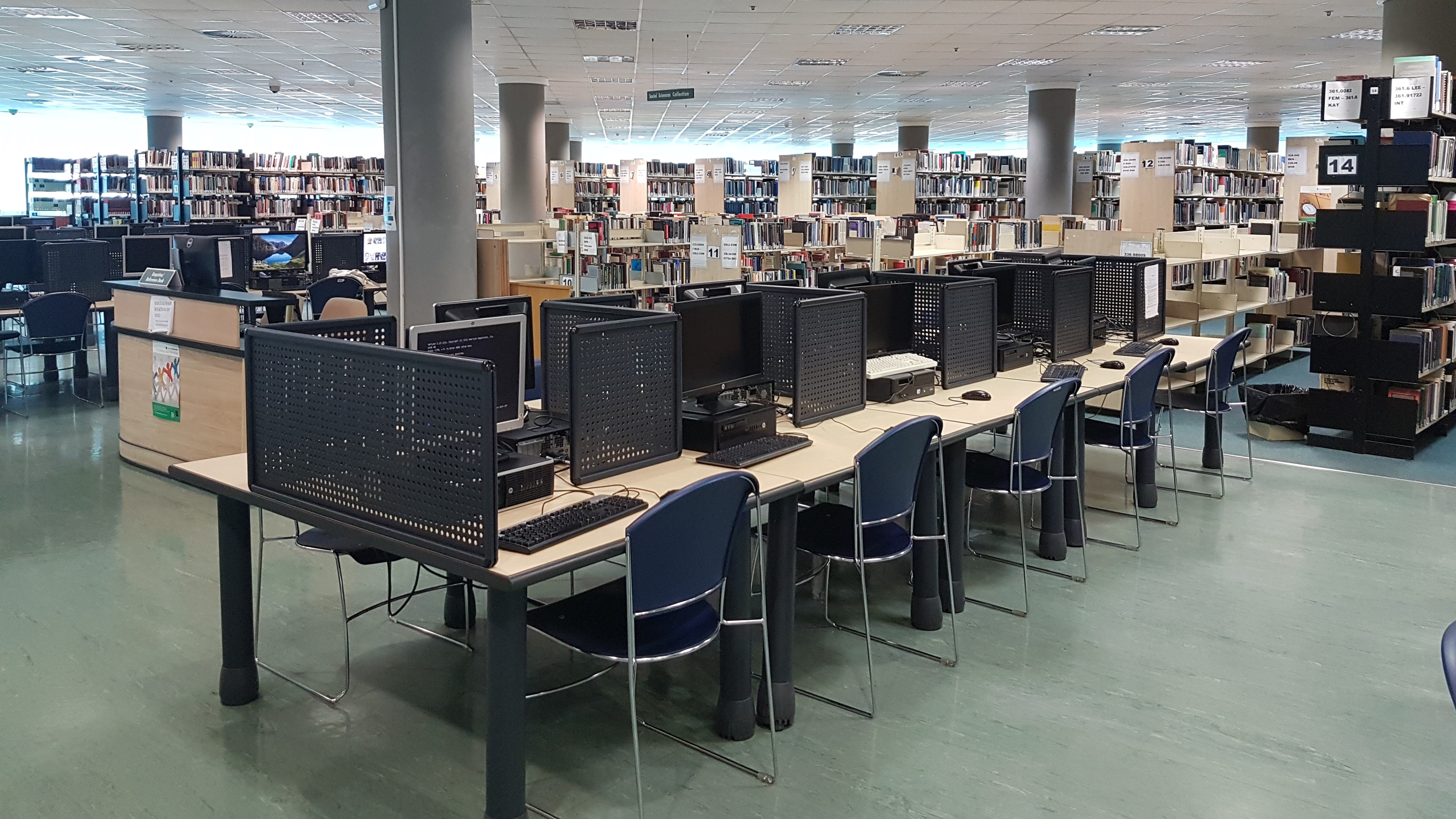
University of Botswana, Central campus (top) and University Library (bottom)

Botswana has made educational progress since independence in 1966 when there were only 22 university graduates in the country and only a very small percentage of the population attended secondary school. Botswana increased its adult literacy rate from 69% in 1991 to 83% in 2008. Among sub-Saharan African countries, Botswana has one of the highest literacy rates. As of 2024, 88.5% of the population aged 15 and over could read and write and were respectively literate.

The Botswana Ministry of Education is working to establish libraries in primary schools in partnership with the African Library Project. The Government of Botswana hopes that investing a large part of national income in education will make the country less dependent on diamonds for its economic survival, and less dependent on expatriates for its skilled workers. NPVET (National Policy on Vocational Education and Training) introduced policies in favour of vocational education. Botswana invests 21% of its government spending in education.

In January 2006, Botswana announced the reintroduction of school fees after two decades of free state education, though the government still provides full scholarships with living expenses to any Botswana citizen in university, either at the University of Botswana or, if the student wishes to pursue an education in any field not offered locally, they are provided with a full scholarship to study abroad.

=== Science and technology ===
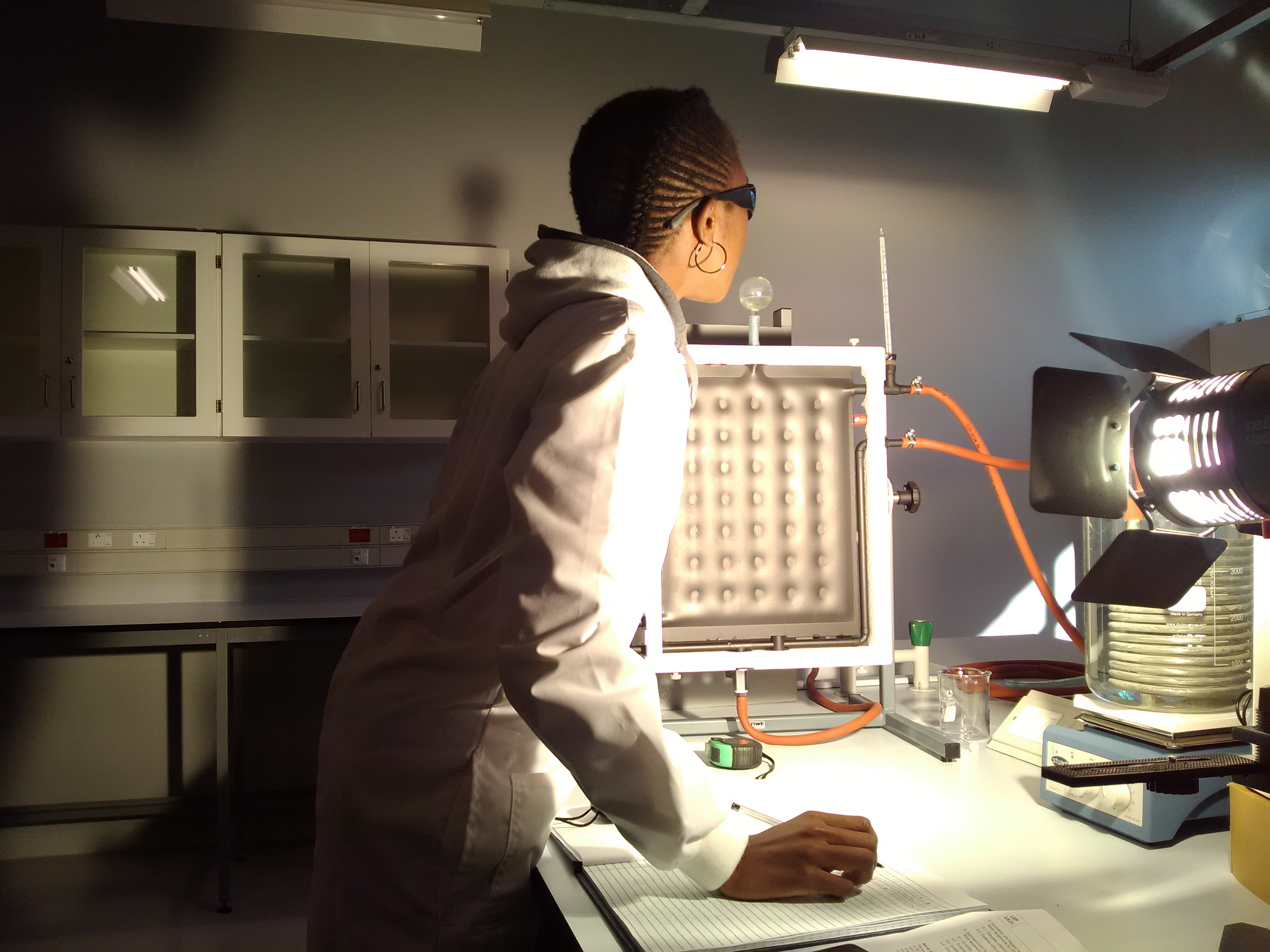
Physicist in a lab at Botswana International University of Science and Technology

In 2015, Botswana planned to use science and technology to diversify its economy and thereby reduce its dependence on diamond mining. Botswana published its updated National Policy on Research, Science and Technology in 2011, within a UNESCO project sponsored by the Spanish Agency for International Cooperation and Development (AECID). This policy was formulated in strategic documents that include Botswana's Tenth National Development Plan for 2016 and Vision 2016. The National Policy on Research, Science, Technology and Innovation (2011) sets the target of raising gross domestic expenditure on research and development (R&D) from 0.26% of GDP in 2012 to over 2% of GDP by 2016. This target can only be reached within the specified time frame by raising public spending on R&D. Botswana counts one of the highest researcher densities in sub-Saharan Africa: 344 per million inhabitants (in head counts), compared to an average of 91 per million inhabitants for the subcontinent in 2013. Botswana was ranked 87th in the Global Innovation Index in 2025.

==== Agriculture and livestock ====
In 2011, Botswana's Department of Agricultural Research (DAR) unveiled Musi cattle, designed to optimise beef production. As a hybrid of the Tswana, Bonsmara, Brahman, Tuli and Simmental breeds, it is hoped that the composite will lead to increased beef production. In 2016, the Botswana Institute of Technology Research and Innovation (BITRI) developed a rapid testing kit for foot-and-mouth disease in collaboration with the Botswana Vaccine Institute and Canadian Food Inspection Agency. The kit developed in Botswana allows for on-site diagnosis.

==== Astronomy ====
The Square Kilometre Array (SKA) (MeerKAT) consists of thousands of dishes and antennas spread over large distances linked together to form one giant telescope. Additional dishes will be located in eight other African countries, Botswana among them. Botswana was selected to participate because of its ideal location in the southern hemisphere and environment, which could enable easier data collection from the universe. The Botswana government has built the SKA precursor telescope at Kgale View, which is the African Very Long Base Line Interferometry Network (AVN). It sent students on astronomy scholarships.

==== Satellite technology and communications ====
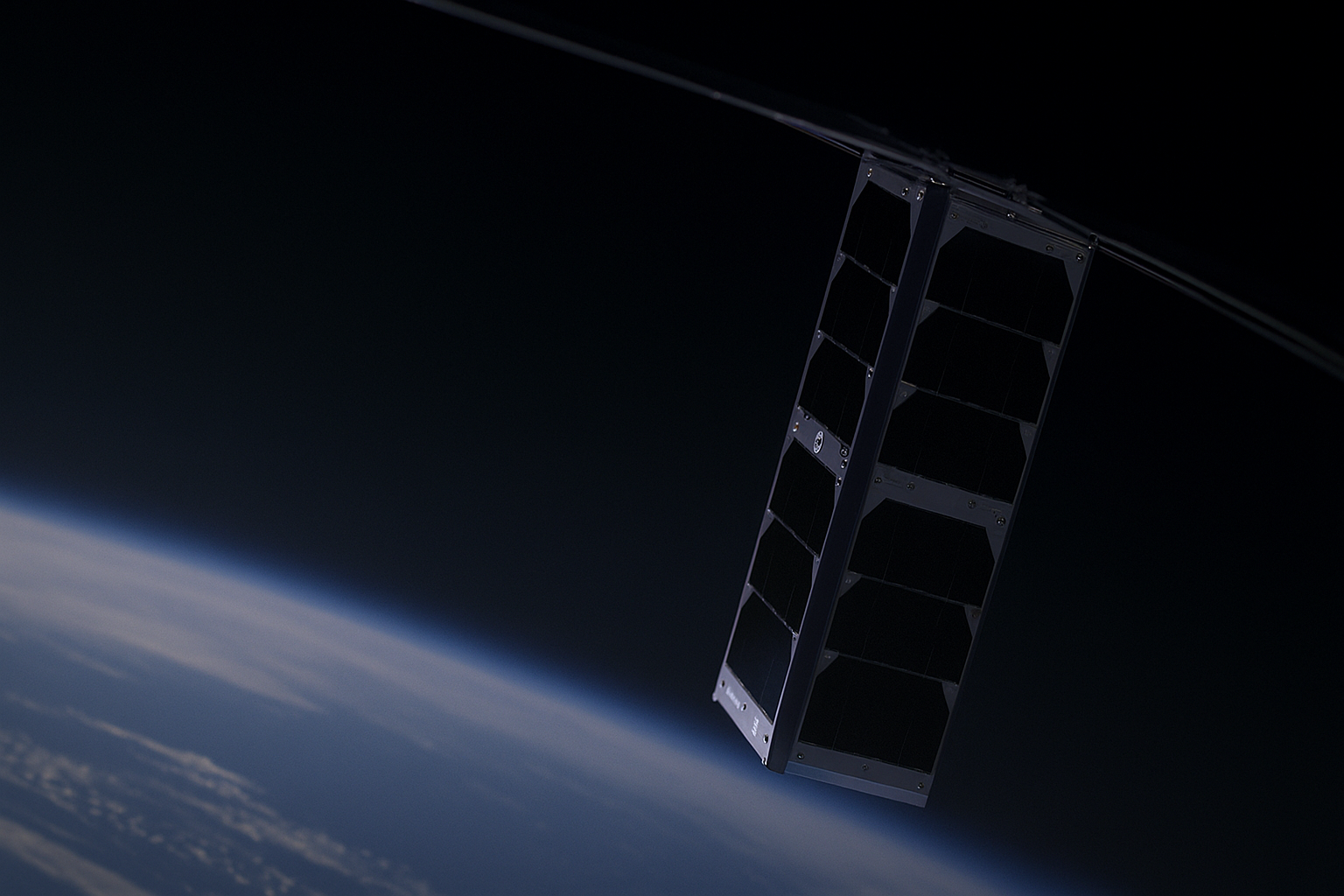
BOTSAT-1 Satellite

Botswana launched its three-year programme to build and launch a Satellite, Botswana Satellite Technology (Sat-1 Project) in Gaborone on 18 December 2020, which was launched using a SpaceX rocket on 15 March. Botswana International University of Science and Technology (BIUST) led satellite development, with technical support from other partners, and is a 3U hyperspectral Earth Observation satellite. The satellite is intended to provide data for environmental monitoring, precision agriculture, urban planning, and disaster management. In 2016, for the IT sector, Almaz opened a first-of-its-kind computer assembly company. Ditec, a Botswana company, also customises, designs and manufactures mobile phones. Ditec specialises in customising Microsoft-powered devices.

==== Virology ====
On 19 November 2021, scientists at the Botswana Harvard HIV Reference Laboratory (BHHRL) first discovered the COVID-19 Omicron variant, subsequently designated B.1.1.529, and then named "Omicron", becoming the first country in the world to discover the variant. Since early 2021, they have genome-sequenced some 2,300 positive SARS-CoV-2 virus samples. According to Dr. Gaseitsiwe, Botswana's genome sequence submissions to GISAID are among the highest in the African region on a per capita basis, on a par with its well-resourced neighbour South Africa. Botswana–Harvard AIDS Institute Partnership (BHP) was built in 2003, two years after the umbrella organisation opened the BHHRL, its purpose-built HIV research lab which was one of the first on the continent.

== See also ==
- Outline of Botswana
- List of Botswana-related topics

== Bibliography ==
=== Books ===
- Bolaane, Maitseo; Mgadla, Part Themba (1997). Batswana. The Rosen Publishing Group. ISBN 9780823920082.
- Denbow, James R.; Thebe, Phenyo C. (2006). Culture and Customs of Botswana. Greenwood Press. ISBN 978-0-313-33178-7. OCLC 62118271.
- Gulbrandsen, Ørnulf (2012). The State and the Social: State Formation in Botswana and its Precolonial and Colonial Genealogies. Berghahn Books. ISBN 978-0-85745-298-6.
- Hillbom, Ellen; Bolt, Jutta (2018). Botswana – A Modern Economic History. Palgrave Macmillan. doi:10.1007/978-3-319-73144-5. ISBN 978-3-319-73144-5.
- Holm, John D.; Molutsi, Patrick P. (1992). "State-Society Relations in Botswana: Beginning Liberalization". In Hydén, Göran; Bratton, Michael (eds.). Governance and Politics in Africa. Lynne Rienner Publishers. pp. 75–95. doi:10.1515/9781685853297. ISBN 978-1-55587-285-4.
- Jackson, Ashley (1999). Botswana, 1939-1945: An African Country at War. Clarendon Press. ISBN 978-0-19-820764-1.
- Leith, James Clark (2005). Why Botswana Prospered. McGill-Queen's University Press. ISBN 978-0-7735-2821-5.
- Tlou, Thomas; Campbell, Alec C. (1997) [1984]. History of Botswana (2nd ed.). Macmillan Botswana. ISBN 9991278087.
- Molutsi, Patrick (2004). "Botswana: The Path to Democracy and Development". In Gyimah-Boadi, E. (ed.). Democratic Reform in Africa. Lynne Rienner Publishers. pp. 159–182. doi:10.1515/9781685857325. ISBN 9781685857325.
- Ramsay, Jeff (1991). "The Batswana–Boer War of 1852-53: How the Batswana achieved victory". Botswana Notes and Records. 23: 193–207. JSTOR 40980851.
- Rotberg, Robert I. (2023). "Botswana: Africa's Democratic Exception". Overcoming the Oppressors: White and Black in Southern Africa. Oxford University Press. pp. 192–231. ISBN 9780197674239.
- Samatar, Abdi Ismail (1999). An African Miracle: State and Class Leadership and Colonial Legacy in Botswana Development. Heinemann. ISBN 978-0-325-00068-8.

=== Journals ===
- Beaulier, Scott A.; Subrick, J. Robert (2006). "The Political Foundations of Development: The Case of Botswana". Constitutional Political Economy. 17 (2): 103–115. doi:10.1007/s10602-006-0002-x. ISSN 1043-4062.
- Brown, Chris (2020). "Botswana Votes 2019: Two-Party Competition and the Khama Factor". Journal of Southern African Studies. 46 (4): 703–722. Bibcode:2020JSAfS..46..703B. doi:10.1080/03057070.2020.1778901. ISSN 0305-7070.
- Kelepile, Matlhogonolo; Kebotsamang, Kago; Mawi, Moagedi; Molebatsi, Kesaobaka; Molefe-Baikai, Onkabetse Julia; Babayani, Nlingisisi; Grady, Sue C.; Mogaetsho, Gaone Edwin; Moshomo, Thato; Kgotlaetsile, Keonayang; Leeme, Tshepo; Gaolathe, Tendani; Mosepele, Mosepele (26 January 2026). "Spatial distribution of central obesity in rural and peri urban communities of Botswana: a nested Botswana Combination Prevention Project (BCPP) cross-sectional study". BMC Public Health. 26 (1): 652. doi:10.1186/s12889-026-26247-1. ISSN 1471-2458. PMC 12918087. PMID 41588385.
- Hjort, Jonas (2009). "Pre-Colonial Culture, Post-Colonial Economic Success? The Tswana and the African Economic Miracle". The Economic History Review. 63 (3): 688–709. doi:10.1111/j.1468-0289.2009.00495.x. PMID 20617585.
- LaRocco, Annette A; Mogende, Emmanuel (2022). "Fall from grace or back down to earth? Conservation and political conflict in Africa's "miracle" state". Environment and Planning E: Nature and Space. 7 (1): 22–49. doi:10.1177/25148486221101553. ISSN 2514-8486.
- Makgala, Christian John; Malila, Ikanyeng Stonto (2022). "Challenges of Constitutional Reform, Economic Transformation and Covid-19 in Botswana". Review of African Political Economy. 49 (172): 303–314. doi:10.1080/03056244.2022.2078559. ISSN 0305-6244.
- Monaka, Kemmonye Collete; Chebanne, Anderson Monthusi (2019). "Setswana and the Building of a Nation State". Anthropological Linguistics. 61 (1): 75–93. ISSN 0003-5483. JSTOR 26907070 – via JSTOR.
- Mosime, Sethunya Tshepho (2020). "Decolonization Deferred: Seretse Khama Ian Khama's Presidency and the Historical Deradicalization of 'Culture' as a Tool for Resistance in Botswana". Alternation: Interdisciplinary Journal for the Study of the Arts and Humanities in Southern Africa. SP36: 188–209. doi:10.29086/2519-5476/2020/sp36a9 (inactive 22 December 2025).
- Ntuane, Botsalo (2018). "President Festus Mogae: The Regent Who Became King". Botswana Notes and Records. 50: 333–338. ISSN 0525-5090. JSTOR 90026925.
- Sebudubudu, David; Botlhomilwe, Mokganedi Zara (2012). "The Critical Role of Leadership in Botswana's Development: What Lessons?". Leadership. 8 (1): 29–45. doi:10.1177/1742715011426962. ISSN 1742-7150.
- Sharma, Keshav C. (23 August 2020). "Role of local government in Botswana for effective service delivery: Challenges, prospects and lessons". Commonwealth Journal of Local Governance (7): 135–142. Archived from the original on 4 June 2024.
- Robinson, James A.; Parsons, Q. Neil (2006). "State Formation and Governance in Botswana". Journal of African Economies. 15 (Supplement 1): 100–140. doi:10.1093/jae/ejk007. ISSN 0963-8024.
- Sianga, Keoikantse; Fynn, Richard (2017). "The vegetation and wildlife habitats of the Savuti-Mababe-Linyanti ecosystem, northern Botswana". Koedoe. 59 (2). doi:10.4102/koedoe.v59i2.1406. eISSN 2071-0771. ISSN 0075-6458.
- Winterbach, Hamlie; Winterbach, Christiaan; Somers, Michael (2014). "Landscape Suitability in Botswana for the Conservation of Its Six Large African Carnivores". Landscape Suitability for Large Carnivores. 9 (6). PLOS One. doi:10.1371/journal.pone.0100202. PMID 4065001.

==== Encyclopedias ====
- Klehm, Carla (28 June 2021). "Archaeology of Botswana". Oxford Research Encyclopedia of African History. doi:10.1093/acrefore/9780190277734.013.792. ISBN 978-0-19-027773-4.
- Maierhöfer, Christian (2025). "Kasikili/Sedudu Island Case (Botswana/Namibia)". Max Planck Encyclopedia of International Law. Oxford University Press. doi:10.1093/law:epil/9780199231690/law-9780199231690-e152.
- Parsons, Neil (31 August 2026). "Botswana". Encyclopedia Britannica.

=== News articles ===
- Chutel, Lynsey (25 October 2019). "Botswana election won by President, despite rift with predecessor". The New York Times.
- Dionne, Kim Yi (30 September 2016). "How democratic is Botswana after 50 years of independence?". The Washington Post.
- Masolotate, Bonang (16 September 2022). "Sub-districts upgrade costs over P60m". Daily News Botswana. Government of Botswana.
- Muia, Wycliffe; Zane, Damian (1 November 2024). "Botswana election: BDP party loses power after nearly six decades to Duma Boko's UDC". BBC News.
- "New Botswana leader eyes cannabis, sunshine to lift economy". France 24. 20 November 2024.
- Ramsay, Jeff (6 May 2017). "The Guns Of Khutiyabasadi (II)". Mmegi. Archived from the original on 24 November 2020.

=== Websites ===
- "Botswana". Collins English Dictionary. HarperCollins. Archived from the original on 26 July 2019.
- Kachipande, Sitinga (17 August 2015). "Botswanan or Batswana? It's complicated – Voices of Africa". Voices of Africa. Archived from the original on 6 January 2018.
- Darkoh, Michael (1999). "Desertification in Botswana" (PDF). IS: Icelandic Agricultural Research Institute. pp. 61–64. Archived from the original (PDF) on 10 October 2010.

=== General sources ===
This article incorporates text from a free content work. Text taken from UNESCO Science Report: Towards 2030, 546–547, UNESCO.
