= Sheila Tlou =

Botswana nurse

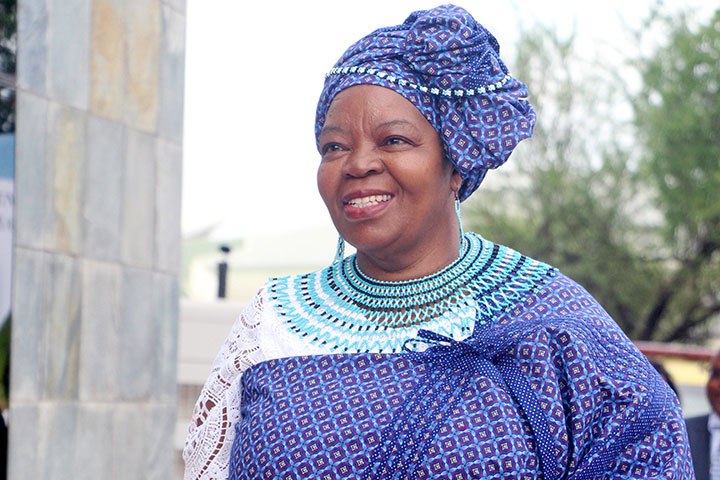
- Sheila Tlou

Minister of Health of Botswana
- In office 9 November 2004 – 1 April 2008

Personal details
- Born: Sheila Dinotshe Tlou Bobonong, Botswana
- Citizenship: Botswana
- Party: Botswana Democratic Party
- Spouse: Thomas Tlou
- Education: Dillard University (BN); Teachers College, Columbia University (MA); Catholic University of America (MSN); University of Illinois Chicago (PhD)
- Occupation: Nurse, nursing educator, health specialist, politician
- Known for: HIV/AIDS advocacy, women's health, nursing leadership
- Awards: Presidential Order of Honour (2002); Florence Nightingale Medal (2003); Princess Srinagarindra Award (2014); Christiane Reimann Award (2017); HRH Princess Muna Al Hussein Award (2018)

Professor Sheila Dinotshe Tlou is a Botswana nurse and nursing educator, specializing in HIV/AIDS and women's health. She served as Minister of Health of Botswana from 2004 to 2008. PTlou has also worked on issues related to human resources for health and health systems development.

== Education ==
Tlou grew up in Botswana. She attended a school taught by Irish nuns—she had a gift for languages and drama, which motivated her dream of a career in Hollywood. She graduated from Dillard University in 1974 with a Bachelor of Nursing degree. In 2014 she was awarded an honorary degree by her alma mater. Tlou studied at Teachers College, Columbia University, U.S., obtaining an M.A. in Education (concentrating in Curriculum and Instruction in the Health Sciences). She also has a Master of Science in Nursing from the Catholic University of America. She took her PhD in community health nursing and a diploma in gender issues, at the University of Illinois at Chicago in 1990.

== Career ==
Tlou has taught at the University of Botswana since 1980. From 1994 to 1996 she was head of Nursing Education, becoming an associate professor in 1999, and from 2002 t0 2004 she was the university's HIV/AIDS coordinator.

Tlou represented Botswana at the 1995 Fourth World Conference on Women in Beijing. In 2002 she was appointed to a special UN task force on girls, women, and HIV/AIDS in southern Africa. She has also provided consultancy to UNAIDS, the UN Commission on the Status of Women and the World Health Organization. She took part in the international community educator meetings for the HIV Vaccine Trials Network. She served for seven years as UNAIDS regional director for Eastern and Southern Africa, where she provided leadership and political advocacy for the AIDS response in 21 African countries.

She has portrayed Precious Ramotswe, the heroine of Alexander McCall Smith's The No. 1 Ladies' Detective Agency book series, in amateur theater productions, and at one time was mentioned in media reports as a possible choice to portray Mma Ramotswe in the Hollywood film adaptation currently in production.

Tlou is currently the co-chair of the Nursing Now Global Campaign and Global HIV Prevention Coalition. Now Global Campaign aims to raise the status and profile of nursing for Universal Health Coverage. Global HIV Prevention Coalition was born out of the need to address the gap and rise in new infections, despite success in treatment and care. She is also Botswana Open University (BOU) Chancellor, an appointment bestowed upon her by the President of the Republic of Botswana, Dr. E. K.Mokgweetsi Masisi, from May 2021 to April 2026. Professor Tlou replaces Dr. PHK Kedikilwe, who retired as Chancellor at the end of 2020.

Tlou is married to Botswana historian Professor Thomas Tlou.

== Positions held ==
Following the October 2004 general election, Tlou was appointed as Minister of Health on November 9, 2004. After being defeated in primary elections of the Botswana Democratic Party (BDP) in Palapye, she was dismissed from the Cabinet on April 1, 2008, when Ian Khama took office as President.

== HIV/AIDS prevention and treatment ==
Much of Tlou's work focuses on gender issues and HIV/AIDS in southern Africa. Enabling women, particularly married women, in a patriarchal society to negotiate with their partner for safe sex has major consequences for HIV transmission. Tlou has worked with grassroots women's organisations and national campaigns to increase AIDS awareness in Botswana. She has also done a great deal of work in reducing the stigma of AIDS and helping HIV positive people cope with their lives.

== Awards ==
- May 2002 Anna Reynvaan prize, and gave prize lecture (Netherlands)
- September 2002 Presidential Order of Honour (Botswana)
- 2003 Florence Nightingale Medal (International Committee of the Red Cross)
- 2014 Princess Srinagarinda Award
- 2017 Christiane Reimann Awards
- 2018 HRH Princess Muna Al Hussein Award

== Works ==
Tlou is a co-editor of the comprehensive reference book for people working in the field of HIV/AIDS in Africa:

- Tlou, Sheila; Essex, Myron; Mboup, Souleymane; Kanki, Phyllis J.; Marlink, Richard G. (2002). AIDS in Africa. New York: Kluwer Academic/Plenum Publishers. ISBN 9780306466991.

Selected other works:

- Tlou, Sheila; Norr, K.; Norr, J. (1993), "The threat of AIDS for women in developing countries", in Lashley, Felissa R.; Durham, Jerry D. (eds.), Women, children, and HIV/AIDS, New York: Springer, ISBN 9780826178800.
- Tlou, Sheila D.; Norr, K.F.; McElmurry, B.J.; Moeti, M. (November–December 1992). "AIDS prevention for women: a community-based approach". Nursing Outlook. 40 (6): 250–256. PMID 1461755.
- Tlou, Sheila D.; et al. (1997). Poverty and plenty: the Botswana experience: proceedings of a symposium. Gaborone, Botswana: The Society. ISBN 9789991260365.
- Tlou, Sheila D. (1997), "Women & AIDS in Southern Africa", in European Commission, Directorate-General for Development (ed.), European Union - Southern African Development Community Conference on HIV/AIDS: proposal for regional action, Malawi, December 4-6 1996, Malawi: European Commission, OCLC 847302580
- Tlou, Sheila; Ingstad, Benedicte; Bruuns, Frank J. (December 1997). "Aids and the elderly Tswana: The concept of pollution and consequences for AIDS prevention". Journal of Cross-Cultural Gerontology. 12 (4): 357–372. doi:10.1023/A:1006501414850. PMID 14617925. S2CID 26857143.
- Tlou, Sheila (2001), "Communication strategy for the introduction of antiretroviral therapy in Botswana", in Zichichi, Antonino (ed.), Nuclear war and planetary emergencies, Singapore London: World Scientific Press.
- Tlou, Sheila; et al. (November 2001). "Mother-to-Child Transmission of HIV-1: Meeting of World Federation of Scientists in Erice, Italy, August 2001. Joint Working Group Report of AIDS and Infectious Diseases PMP, and Mother and Child Health PMP". Acta Paediatrica. 90 (11): 1337–1339. doi:10.1111/j.1651-2227.2001.tb01585.x. PMID 11808909. S2CID 73276077.
- Tlou, Sheila; Lindsey, Elizabeth; Hirschfeld, Miriam (May–June 2003). "Home-based care in Botswana: Experiences of older women and young girls". Health Care for Women International. 24 (6): 486–501. doi:10.1080/07399330390199384. PMID 12851169. S2CID 25217406.
- Tlou, Sheila D. (1998). "Outcomes of a community-based HIV/AIDS education programme in Botswana". Southern African Journal of Gerontology. 7 (2): 23-26.
