= Beaulier =

Beaulier is a surname. Notable people with the surname include:

- Calvin Beaulier, American politician
- Patrick Beaulier, American writer and musician
- Scott Beaulier, American economist

== See also ==
- Beaulieu
