= Alec Campbell (archaeologist) =

Alexander Colin Campbell (16 April 1932 – 24 November 2012) was an archaeologist and museum curator in Botswana. He was Emeritus Director of Botswana's Department of Wildlife and National Parks and National Monuments.

== Life ==
Campbell was born in Cheltenham, England. He entered the British South Africa Police in the British colony of Southern Rhodesia in 1951. Transferring to the agricultural department as a tsetse fly officer in 1954, he entered Rhodes University in 1959, graduating in SiNdebele and Social Anthropology. Becoming a district officer in the Bechuanaland Protectorate in 1962, Campbell ran the country's first house-to-house census in 1963–4. After independence he became senior warden of Botswana's Department of Wildlife and National Parks. He founded and was later director of Botswana's National Museum and Art Gallery. A founder-member of the Botswana Society in 1969, he chaired the editorial board of its journal, Botswana Notes and Records, for 30 years.

In the 1970s Campbell worked to overturn the previous consensus that Botswana had little Stone Age activity.

Campbell lived on a farm near Gaborone with his wife Judy Campbell, who also wrote on historical topics with him. He died, aged 80, in Gaborone.

== Works ==
- (with Thomas Tlou) History of Botswana, 1984
- The nature of Botswana : a guide to conservation and development, 1990
- (with David Coulson) African rock art : paintings and engravings on stone, 2001
- (ed. with Larry Robbins and Michael Taylor) Tsodilo hills : copper bracelet of the Kalahari, 2008
