= Cancer Association of Botswana =

Non-governmental organization

- Abbreviation: CAB
- Formation: 1998
- Type: non-governmental organization

Cancer Association of Botswana (CAB) is a volunteer run, non-governmental organization established as a trust in 1998. They are dedicated to reducing the impact of cancer on all affected in Botswana.

== Mission ==
Cancer Association of Botswana is dedicated to reducing the impact of cancer on all affected in Botswana by increasing awareness and education to promote healthy lifestyles and early detection of cancer, facilitating medical care and providing counseling and support to those affected.

== Programs ==
- Awareness

CAB promotes prevention and health promotion through talks, conferences, campaigns and the distribution of brochures and posters throughout the country.

- Care

Through Tshiamo House (the Interim Care Home) temporary accommodation, medical care, and meals are provided to patients while they are receiving treatment at Princess Marina Hospital and Gaborone Private Hospital. Cancer Association of Botswana also provides transportation for patients to go to the hospitals for treatment.

- Support

CAB offers free, confidential counseling to patients, family, and friends. After-care is also offered to patients after returning to their respective homes through follow up telephone calls and home visits.

- Reach for Recovery

CAB has a group of survivors who visit cancer patients at their homes and provide them with emotional and spiritual support. This allows for a process whereby cancer victims transform into cancer survivors through active, optimistic and healthy outlook and lifestyle.
