= Thomas Tlou =

Botswana academic and historian

- President: Ian Khama

Personal details
- Born: Gwanda, Southern Rhodesia

Thomas Tlou (1 June 1932 – 28 June 2010) was a Motswana academic and historian, and former representative of Botswana at the United Nations. Tlou was born in Gwanda in the then Southern Rhodesia in 1932.

Tlou studied at Luther College from 1962 to 1965, where he graduated magna cum laude in African history. Tlou also studied at Johns Hopkins University, and the University of Wisconsin–Madison in the United States. In 1971 he joined the University of Botswana, Lesotho and Swaziland,(UBLS), the fore-runner of the University of Botswana, to teach history. He left academia to perform government service and from 1976 to 1980 was Botswana's permanent representative at the United Nations.

Tlou was the first Motswana (Botswana citizen) to be vice-chancellor of the University of Botswana, serving from 1985 to 1998. Thereafter he continued at the same university as professor of history, finally retiring in 2006.

Tlou was also chair of the Association of Commonwealth Universities and served on the executive board of the Association of African Universities. In Botswana he served on the Tertiary Education Council and as of 2005 he was chair of the Botswana Institute for Development Policy Analysis (BIDPA).

He was married to Professor Sheila Tlou, Botswana's minister of health from 2004 to 2008 and a former associate professor of nursing at the University of Botswana.

== Awards ==
In 2006 Tlou was awarded an honorary doctorate from the University of Cape Town He also received the Botswana Presidential Order of Honour, and was made a Chevalier dans L'Ordre des Palmes académiques by France.

== Works ==
Tlou has written or co-written many of the standard texts on Botswana history.

- Tlou, Thomas; Campbell, Alec (1997). History of Botswana (2nd ed.). Gaborone: Macmillan. ISBN 0-333-36531-3.
- Tlou, Thomas; Parsons, Neil; Henderson, Willie (1995). Seretse Khama, 1921-1980. Macmillan.
- Tlou, Thomas (1985). A History of Ngamiland: 1750 to 1906. Macmillan.
