= Freedom of religion in Botswana =

The Constitution provides for freedom of religion, with certain exceptions.

== Religious demography ==
According to the country’s 2011 census, 79% of the population are members of Christian groups, 15% do not follow a religion, 4% follow the Badimo indigenous religion and 2% follow other beliefs.

== Status of religious freedom ==
=== Legal and policy framework ===
The Constitution provides for freedom of religion. There is no state religion. Although it is common for government meetings to begin with a Christian prayer, members of other religious groups are not excluded from leading non-Christian prayers at such occasions. The Constitution also provides for the protection of the rights and freedoms of other persons, including the right to observe and practice any religion without the unsolicited intervention of members of any other religion.

All organizations, including religious groups, must register with the Government. There are no legal benefits for registered organizations, although an organization must be registered before it can conduct business, sign contracts, or open an account in a local bank. Any person who holds an official position in, manages, or assists in the management of an unregistered organization is liable to a fine of up to $79 (Pula 1,000) and/or up to 7 years in prison. Any member of an unregistered society is liable to penalties including fines up to $39 (Pula 500) and/or up to three years in prison.

Religious education is an optional part of the curriculum in public schools; it emphasizes Christianity but addresses other religious groups in the country.

In 2007, only Christian holy days were recognized as public holidays. These included Good Friday, Easter Monday, Ascension Day, and Christmas Day. However, members of other religious groups were allowed to commemorate their religious holidays without government interference.

=== Restrictions on religious freedom ===
In 2023, the country was scored 4 out of 4 for religious freedom; all religious groups must register with the government.

There were no reports of religious prisoners or detainees in the country in 2022.
