= Commonwealth Journal of Local Governance =

- Discipline: Political science
- Language: English
- Edited by: Alison Brown, Graham Sansom

Publication details
- History: 2008–present
- Publisher: UTS Centre for Local Government/UTS ePRESS
- Open access: Yes
- License: CC BY 4.0

Standard abbreviations
- ISO 4: Commonw. J. Local Gov.

Indexing
- ISSN: 1836-0394

Links
- Journal homepage

The Commonwealth Journal of Local Governance is a journal published by the Commonwealth Local Government Forum and the UTS Centre for Local Government (University of Technology, Sydney). The first issue was published on 29 April 2008. The journal is open access.
