= Jonas Hjort =

Economist

- Born: Jonas Krabbe Hjort
- Citizenship: American, Danish, and Norwegian
- Occupation: Economist
- Known for: Research on firms, labor markets, and digital infrastructure in developing countries

Academic background
- Education: London School of Economics (BSc); Yale University (MA); University of California, Berkeley (PhD)

Academic work
- Discipline: Economics
- Sub-discipline: Development economics
- Institutions: University College London; University of Oslo
- Website: Information at IDEAS / RePEc

Jonas Hjort is an economist and the Professor of Economics at University College London (UCL). He is known for his research in development economics, specifically regarding labor markets, firm structure, and the impact of technology in developing nations.

== Education ==
Hjort completed his undergraduate studies at the London School of Economics, earning a BSc in Economics in 2005. He then attended Yale University, where he received a MA in International and Development Economics in 2006. He earned his PhD in Economics from the University of California, Berkeley in 2012.

== Academic career ==
Hjort began his academic career at Columbia Business School, serving as an assistant professor of economics from 2012 to 2018, and subsequently as an associate professor. In November 2021, he joined University College London as a professor of economics. Since January 2024, he has also held a part-time professorship at the University of Oslo.

Hjort serves as a co-editor of the Journal of the European Economic Association since 2023.

== Research ==
Hjort is a development economist whose research examines production in developing countries, with particular focus on firms, organizations, and workers. His work studies how incomplete contracting, information and trade costs, and limited state capacity affect productivity and economic performance.

One strand of his research analyzes how relationships within and between firms influence outcomes in environments where formal contracts are difficult to enforce. This includes work on ethnic divisions and firm performance, as well as studies of supplier relationships and vertical integration among exporters.

A second strand examines how changes in information and trade costs shape labor markets and firm organization. In this context, he has studied the labor market effects of broadband expansion in Africa, wage-setting in multinational firms, and the economic impact of internet connectivity in developing countries.

A third strand focuses on public-sector organizations and state effectiveness, including research on bureaucratic performance and the interaction between research and public policy.

His work combines theoretical frameworks with empirical analysis using administrative and firm-level data, quasi-experimental methods, and randomized controlled trials.

== Awards and honors ==
Hjort received the CESifo Prize for best paper in Applied Microeconomics in 2013. In 2015, he was awarded the Sandmo Junior Visiting Fellowship at the Norwegian School of Economics. He received the Oliver Williamson Award for Best Paper from the Society of Institutional and Organizational Economics in 2018. In 2022, he was awarded an ERC Consolidator Grant from the European Research Council. He is an elected Fellow of the European Economic Association.
