= Scott Beaulier =

American economist

Academic background
- Education: Northern Michigan University; George Mason University

Academic work
- Discipline: Economics

Scott Beaulier is an American economist and academic administrator who serves as the H.A. (Dave) True Family Dean of Business and Professor of Economics at the University of Wyoming College of Business. He previously served as Dean of North Dakota State University's College of Business (NDSU) from 2016 to 2022. Earlier in his career, he held administrative and faculty roles at Arizona State University, Troy University, Mercer University, and Beloit College.

== Early life and education ==
Beaulier was born and raised in Iron Mountain, Michigan. A first-generation college student, he attended Northern Michigan University in Marquette, where he developed an interest in economics after taking a course with economist David Prychitko. He earned a B.A. in economics and history in 2000.

He then completed an M.A. (2002) and Ph.D. (2004) in economics at George Mason University. His doctoral dissertation focused on economic development and institutional quality, and was supervised by Peter Boettke.

== Academic career ==
After completing his Ph.D., Beaulier held faculty positions at several institutions, including:

- Mercer University, as Department Chair of Economics (2008–2010)
- Beloit College, as an economics faculty member
- Troy University, where he became executive director of the Manuel H. Johnson Center for Political Economy and Chair of Economics and Finance

His research in this period focused on economic development, the political economy of poverty, and economic policy.

Arizona State University

In 2014, Beaulier became the executive director of the Center for the Study of Economic Liberty in the W.P. Carey School of Business at Arizona State University. The center was founded with $5 million in philanthropic support to advance scholarship on economic freedom and public policy.

North Dakota State University

In 2016, Beaulier was appointed Dean of the NDSU College of Business.

During his six-year tenure:

- He led the college through two AACSB accreditation reviews.
- The college received philanthropic support for faculty, students, and new programs
- NDSU launched the Sheila and Robert Challey Institute for Global Innovation and Growth, a $50 million initiative focused on the drivers of innovation, opportunity, and growth.

In 2019, Beaulier became the first named dean in NDSU history when appointed the Ronald & Kaye Olson Dean of Business.

He served as dean until July 2022, when he accepted the Wyoming appointment.

University of Wyoming

In 2022, Beaulier was named the Dean of Business at the University of Wyoming, which was then endowed in 2023 as the H.A. (Dave) True Family Dean of Business. In 2026, he was reappointed to a second four-year term as dean.

Service and Professional Activities

Beaulier has served as a volunteer reviewer and site-visit evaluator for AACSB International. He also served for ten years on the board of the Institute for Humane Studies, in addition to other community and nonprofit boards.

Research Interests

Beaulier's research has addressed political economy, economic development, institutional quality, pension reform, and the history of economic ideas. He has also written on higher education governance and academic freedom. He writes The Arena, an online publication about economics, institutions, higher education, and public policy.

== Personal life ==
Beaulier is an avid distance runner and has completed more than 20 marathons, including the Boston Marathon on four occasions. He is married to Anemone Beaulier, a poet and writer. They have four children and reside in Laramie, Wyoming.

== Selected publications ==
"Economic Freedom and Philanthropy" (with Jeremy Jackson), Journal of Economic Behavior & Organization 214, 148-183 (2023)

"We Have Met the Enemy, and He Is Us," Independent Review 27 (3), 391-398 (2022)

"The Political Economy of Flannery O'Connor" (with Anemone Beaulier), Independent Review 25 (2021)

"An Ordinal Ranking of Economic Institutions" (with Elder, Han, Hall), Applied Economics 48 (26), 2482-2490 (2016)

"Behavioral Economics and Perverse Effects of the Welfare State" (with Bryan Caplan), Kyklos 60 (4), 485-507 (2007)

"Explaining Botswana's Success: The Critical Role of Post-Colonial Policy," Cato Journal 23 (2003)
