= Culture of Botswana =

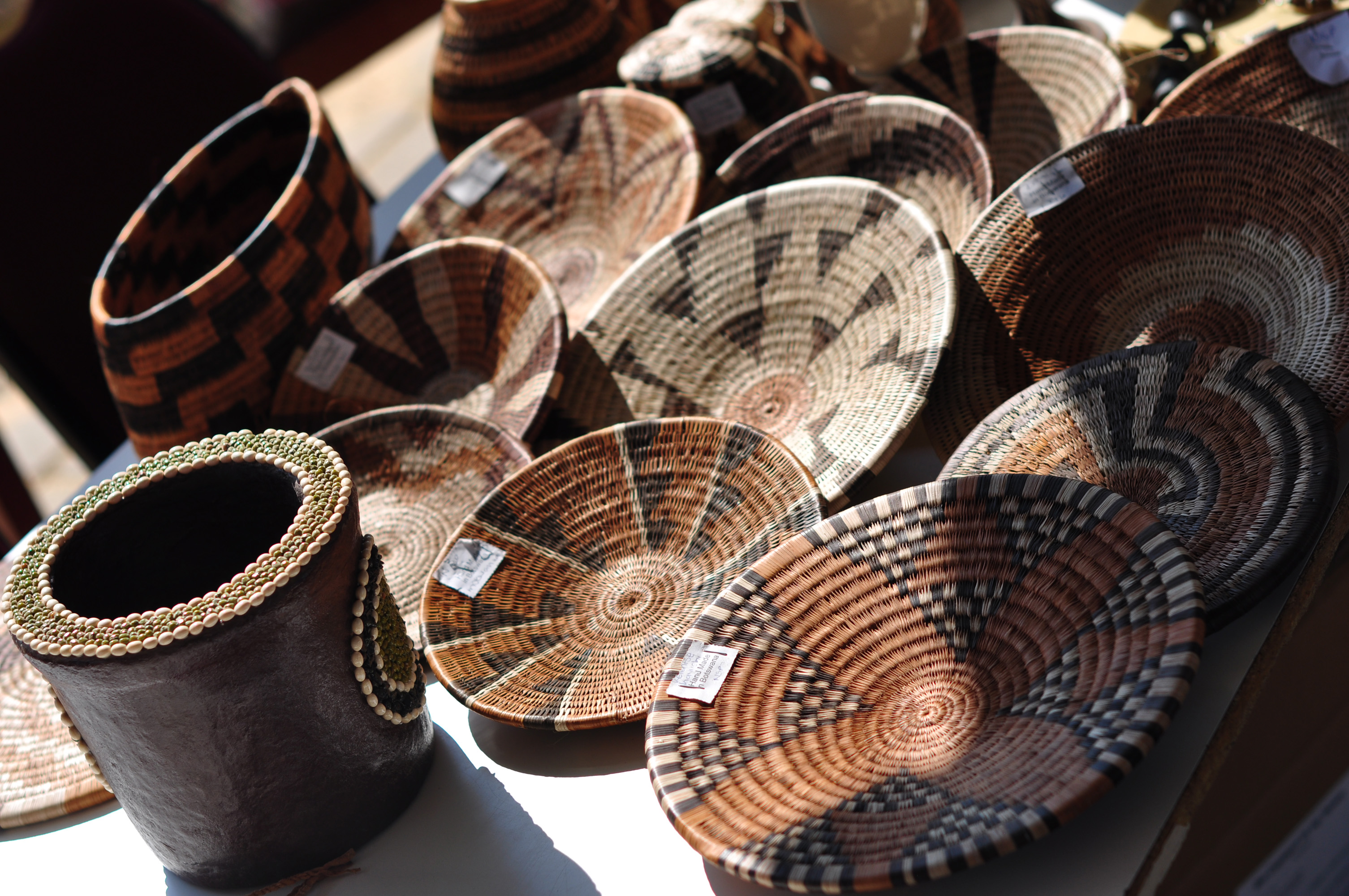
Botswana traditional baskets

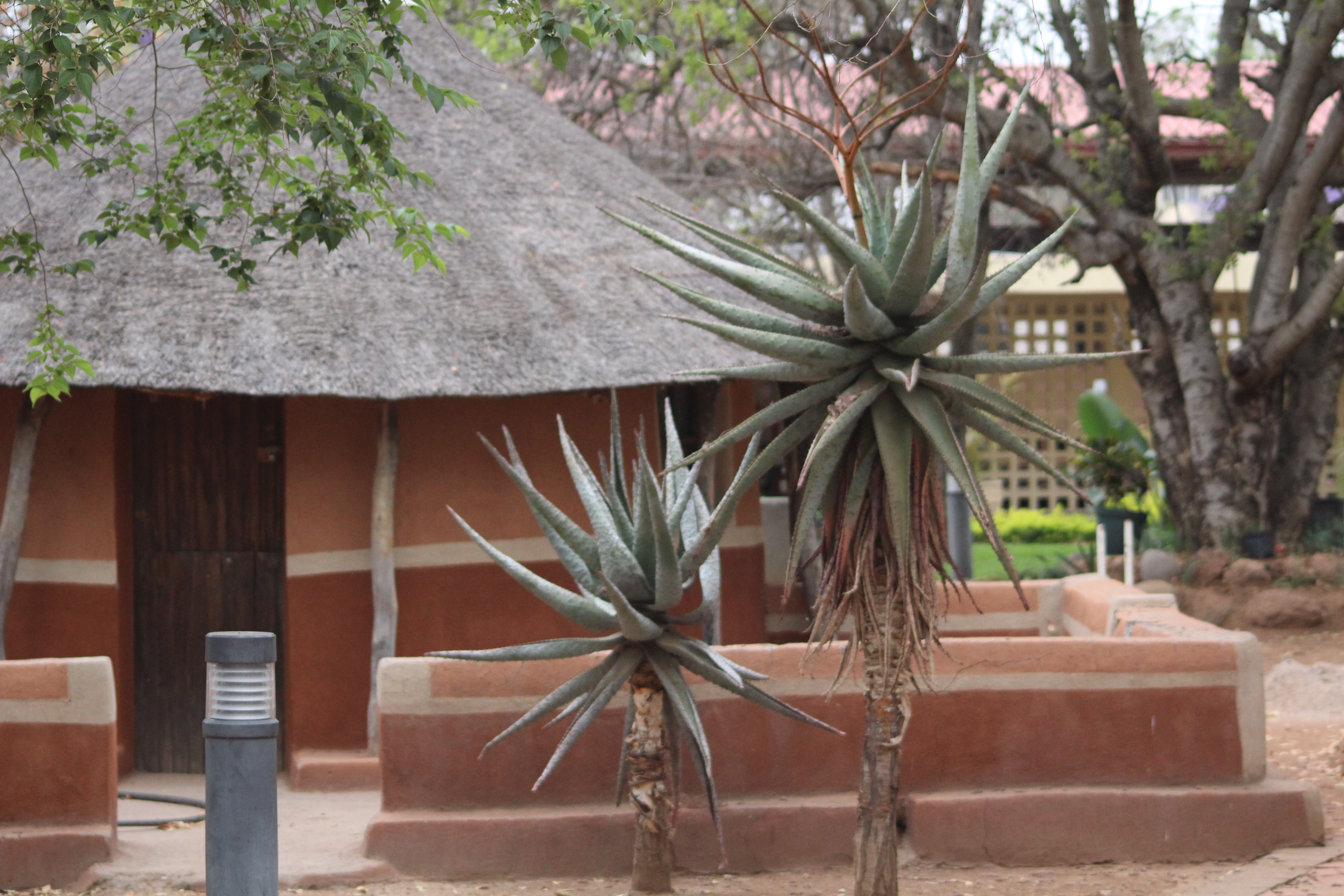
Botswana traditional house at the National Museum

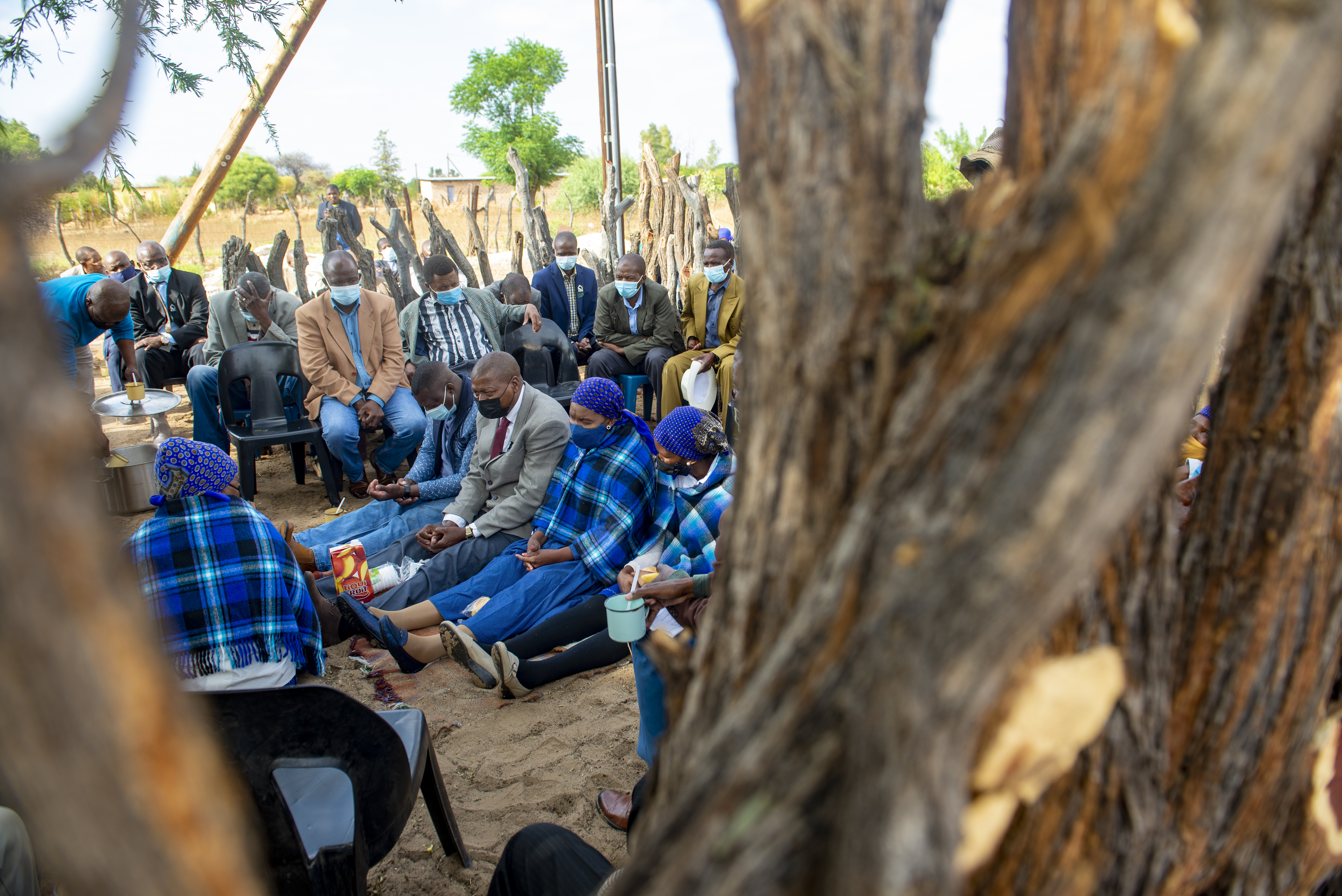
Magadi (traditional wedding)

Besides referring to the language of the dominant people groups in Botswana, Setswana is the adjective used to describe the rich cultural traditions of the Batswana - whether construed as members of the Setswana ethnic groups or of all citizens of Botswana. the Batswana believe in the rich culture of Botho-Ubuntu, "People are not individuals, living in a state of independence, but part of a community, living in relationships and interdependence." Batswana values place a strong emphasis on working together and communal unity.

The name Batswana is used as a nationality for the people of Botswana and as an ethnicity for people who practice the same culture and speak the same language in neighbouring South Africa. There are different ethnic groups in the country of Botswana, among them are the Tswana (Barolong, Bakwena, Bangwato, Batlokwa, Bakgatla, Baphuthing, Bataung, Bangwaketse, Batawana, Bahurutshe, Balete); BaKalanga (BaLilima, Baperi, BaWumbe, BaNambya); Ovaherero (Baherero, Ovambanderu); Wayei, Bambukushu; Veekuhane (Basubiya in Setswana); Khoe & San groups; Batswapong and Batshweneng. All these tribes believe in different customs; however, because of living together and inter-marrying for more than a century, they have now developed some similarities, which are seen in the changing or developing languages in the country as well as shared cultures. The languages differ significantly from one area to another or by the ethnic dialects but they are all regarded as Botswana languages. Some Tswana people are based in the Northwest Province of the Republic of South Africa, and Botswana.

== Literature ==
=== Alexander McCall Smith ===
Botswana forms the setting for The No. 1 Ladies' Detective Agency, a series of popular mystery novels by Alexander McCall Smith (born 1948). Their protagonist, Precious Ramotswe, lives in Gaborone. The first novel in the series, The No. 1 Ladies' Detective Agency, was published in the UK in 1998 (and 2001 in the US). The light-hearted books are praised for their human interest and local colour. A BBC Television series adaption of the same name was filmed, with a pilot appearing on 23 March 2008 in the United Kingdom, and the full series starting on 15 March 2009.

=== Norman Rush ===
Norman Rush, who served as a Peace Corps director in Botswana from 1978 to 1983, uses the country as the setting for all of his published books, which generally focus on the expatriate community.

=== Unity Dow ===
Unity Dow (born 1959) is a judge, human rights activist, and writer from Botswana. She comes from a rural background that tended towards traditional African values. Her mother could not read English, and in most cases decision-making was done by men. She went on to become a lawyer with much of her education being done in the West. Her Western education caused a mixture of respect and suspicion.

As a lawyer, she earned acclaim most for her stance on women's rights. She was the plaintiff in a case that allowed the children of women by foreign nationals to be considered Batswana. The tradition and law before this stated that nationality only descended from the father. She later became Botswana's first female High Court judge.

As a novelist, she has had three books published. The subject matter of these books is often issues concerning the struggle between Western and traditional values. They also involve Dow's interest in gender issues and her nation's poverty.

=== Bessie Head ===
Bessie Head (1937–1986) is a writer well known in Southern Africa. In 1964, she fled the apartheid regime in South Africa to live in and wrote about Botswana. She lived there from 1964 (when it was still the Bechuanaland Protectorate) until her death at the age of 49 in 1986. She lived in Serowe, and her most famous books, When Rain Clouds Gather, Maru, and A Question of Power are set there.

=== Susan Williams ===
British author and historian Susan Williams' book, Colour Bar: The Triumph of Seretse Khama and His Nation, tells the story of the interracial marriage and resulting struggles of Sir Seretse Khama and Lady Ruth Williams Khama.

A collection of humorous true short stories, Whatever You Do, Don't Run (released in the United Kingdom and South Africa as Don't Run, Whatever You Do), contains many stories from Botswana written by a safari guide, Peter Allison.

=== Michael Stanley ===
In 2008, a mystery novel (A Carrion Death) by Michael Stanley introduced Detective David "Kubu" Bengu of the Botswana Criminal Investigation Department. The memorable Kubu lives in Gaborone. The novel is a police procedural that also provides an excellent introduction to today's Botswana.

=== Other writers ===
- Caitlin Davies, born in Britain
- Unity Dow
- Bessie Head, born in South Africa
- Moteane Melamu
- Barolong Seboni, poet
- Andrew Sesinyi

== Visual arts ==
Infers Group Arting Health 2018 Science Communication Sexual Health HIV funded by the welcome trust

In the northern part of Botswana, the Wayeyi and Hambukushu women in the villages of Etsha and Gumare are noted for their skill at crafting baskets (baskets from Botswana) from Mokola Palm and local dyes. The baskets are generally woven into three types: large, lidded baskets used for storage, large, open baskets for carrying objects on the head or for winnowing threshed grain, and smaller plates for winnowing pounded grain. The artistry of these baskets is being steadily enhanced through color use and improved designs as they are increasingly produced for commercial use.

Other notable artistic communities include Thamaga Pottery or Botswelelo and Oodi Weavers, both located in the southeastern part of Botswana.

The oldest paintings from both Botswana and South Africa depict hunting, both animal and human figures, and were made by the Khoisan (Kung San!/Bushmen) over 20,000 years ago within the Kalahari desert.

== Music ==
Botswana is made up of numerous ethnic groups, though the Batswana are the most numerous. Music is an omnipresent part of Botswana culture, and include popular and folk forms. Church choirs are common across the country. Music education is an integral part of the educational system. Children of all ages are taught traditional songs and dances.

=== Folk music ===
Tswana music is mostly vocal and performed without drums; it also makes heavy use of string instruments. Tswana folk music has got instruments such as Setinkane, Segankure/Segaba and for the last few decades, a guitar has been celebrated as a versatile music instrument for Tswana music. The guitar was originally played in a manner similar to Segaba but with a better rhythm due to plucking, almost completely replacing the violin-like Segaba until such prodigies of Segaba as Ratsie Setlhako re-popularised Segaba in the 80s with the help of radio. In the absence of instruments a clapping rhythm is used in music with the typical chant and answer manner of singing. The absence of drumming is predominant and is peculiar of an African tribe.

==== Styles ====
- Borankana
- Chesa
- Huru
- Mokomoto
- Ndazola
- Phathisi
- Selete
- Setapa
- Stibikoko
- Tsutsube

==== Folk musicians ====
- Culture Spears
- Dikakapa
- George Swabi
- Jonny Kobedi
- Kwataeshele
- Machesa Traditional Troupe
- Matsieng
- Mokorwana
- Ratsie Setlhako
- Shirley
- Shumba Ratshega
- Speech Madimabe
- Stampore
- Stikasola

=== Popular music ===
Like many African countries, much of the popular music there is called Jazz, though it has little resemblance to the African American genre of that name. There has been a push in recent years to focus on revitalizing the Botswana music industry instead of purchasing foreign releases. Most popular music in Botswana still comes from South Africa, United States, Europe or elsewhere in Africa. Gumba-gumba is a form of modernized Zulu and Tswana music, mixed with traditional jazz; the word gumba comes from township slang for party.

==== Hip hop ====
Botswana hip hop crews include The Wizards, a long-standing crew that fuses hip hop with ragga and R&B. The television show Strictly Hip Hop, hosted by Draztik and Slim (both of the Cashless Society Crew and co-founders of Unreleased Records), has played an important role for the scene in Botswana. The record label Phat Boy has also been instrumental to the success of the hip hop scene in Botswana.

==== Kwasa Kwasa ====
An African version of rhumba popularized in Central Africa has taken a strong following in Botswana and has produced highly acclaimed musicians such as Frank Lesokwane of Franco and Afro Musica, Jeff Matheatau, Chris Manto 7 and Alfredo Mos and Les Africa sounds. It has a slower Rhythm than the original type and predictably tends to get a rapid rhythm in the middle of the song. It is still not as hectic as its parent Afro rhumba. Unlike Rhumba, Kwasa Kwasa has a simple leg routine, focusing more on an erotic movement of hips and buttocks.

Some artists have attempted to speed it up and made it more Danceable to breakdance with great success. Artist Vee is one of them and his version is known as Kwaito Kwasa, from a combination of Kwaito music with a Kwasa Kwasa rhythm and guitar.

==== Rock ====
The development of rock as a genre in Botswana has been a slow one. The music has however started to gain some momentum, partly due to the youth's exposure to mainstream media like MTV, Channel O and the internet. Metal Orizon, the country's first heavy metal band, was formed in the early 1990s. The native Batswana have since showed appreciation for this genre. Ever since the year 2000, a lot of bands have been formed. Most these have played locally and a few have toured southern Africa. Fans keep up to date with the music through word of mouth, tape trading and social networks, and there is a 50-minute show broadcast on national radio which plays metal music. The rock culture is now evidently recognised, with bands coming together to fight AIDS under a tour titled "Rock Against AIDS".

Notable bands include:

- Wrust - albums include Soulless Machine (2007) and Intellectual Metamorphosis (2013): the most popular metal band in Botswana, they have toured South Africa and have supported Sepultura
- Metal Orizon - one album (Miopic Illusion)
- Nosey Road - several albums
- Stealth
- Stane
- Skinflint - Massive Destruction (2009), IKLWA (2010), Gauna (2011)

=== Music institutions ===
The National Music Eisteddfod is held annually in Selebi-Phikwe.

== See also ==
- Religion in Botswana
