= Dithubaruba Cultural Festival =

National cultural festival in Botswana

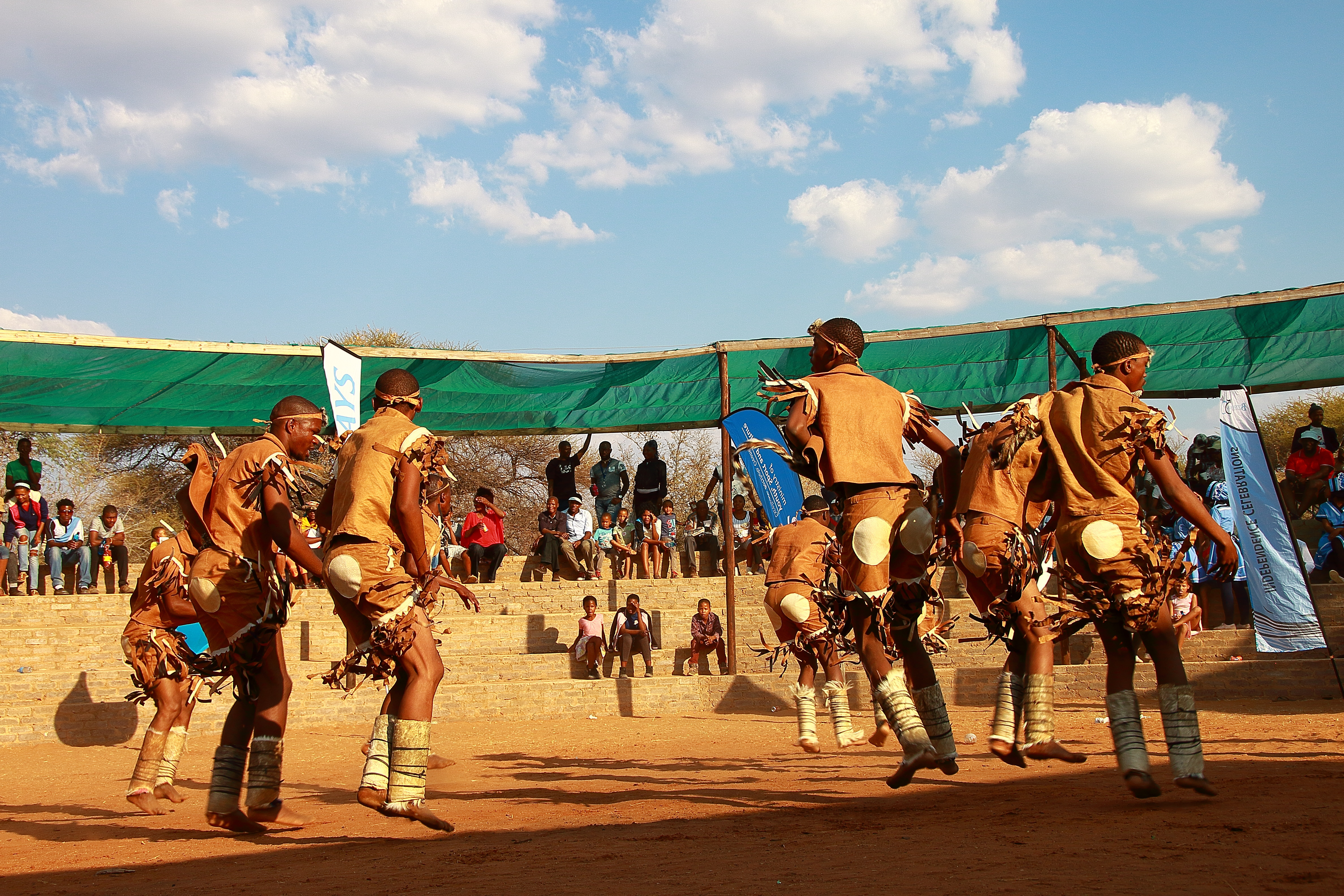
- Phathisi Dance, the festival's main dance
- Status: Active
- Genre: Festival
- Venue: Ntsweng Heritage Site
- Locations: Near Molepolole, Botswana

The Dithubaruba Cultural Festival is one of the national events celebrated in Botswana and is also marked in the Botswana Calendar of Events. It aims to promote Kweneng cultural heritage and create leisure time for the community.

== Background ==
The Dithubaruba event focuses on the culture of Bakwena of Molepolole and the significant role played by their late chief, Kgosi Sechele I, during his reign in the 1800s. The event takes place at the Ntsweng heritage site, organized by Kgosi Sechele I Museum. It is sponsored by the Botswana Tourism Organization (BTO) and the Ministry of Youth Empowerment, Sport and Culture Development (MYSC). Since its inception in 2007, it has aimed to promote the local culture and a sense of belonging through various cultural activities.

== Kgosi Sechele I ==
Kgosi Sechele I (1812–1892) played an integral part in the history of Bakwena and the rationale behind the Dithubaruba Cultural Festival. He defended Batswana against the Boers of Transvaal during the battle of Dimawe in 1852. The tribes which were protected from the Boer attack included Bangwaketse, Bakgatla bagaMmanaana, Bakaa, and Bakwena. Sechele then relocated to Ntsweng due to an outbreak of diseases, among other reasons.

== Ntsweng Heritage Site ==
Chief Sechele I moved his capital from Kolobeng to Ntsweng (a place of rock or a hill) in 1864, a more easily defendable site. The chief's house was built at the hilltop because of the possibility of Boer attacks. Ntsweng, a monument located Southeast of Molepolole, was abandoned in 1934 when Bakwena were forced to move by Chief Kgari II and colonial administrators. The current day Ntsweng is a large area, with notable stones and "Mmakgosi's house," which was used as Sebele II's office. The inadequate natural resource management can be blamed for making this historic site an abandoned capital.

== Kgosi Sechele I Museum ==
The Kgosi Sechele I Museum is one of the cultural and historical tourist attraction sites of Molepolole. It was built in 1902 and its exhibitions are meant for preserving the culture of Bakwena. The museum has a library that houses books of Dr. A.M. Merriweather the then Evangelist and doctor at Scottish Livingstone Hospital, and holds a section of the museum dedicated to Kgosi Sechele I.

== Activities of the day ==
Dithubaruba is celebrated with various cultural activities ranging from traditional song and dance, poetry, contemporary music, drama, traditional food, and games. The main dance is phathisi, categorized under "setapa", where both males and females of any age group dance. The dance involves females singing, clapping, and ululating, while men dance and blow the whistle for an enhanced rhythm. The dance is done wearing a traditional costume and rattles (matlhoa). Renowned performance groups and well-known artists are invited to perform on the day, such as Culture Spears, Dr. Vom, Shelley Mokokwe, Dipela TSA ga kobokwe, Bana ba kwena, Shiqkaao, Giraffe, Dintsu TSA Malwelwe, and others.

Bakwena celebrate the day with a thanksgiving ceremony called Dikgafela. Elderly women usually carry the harvest and traditional beer brewed from the harvest, on their heads to the kgotla for people to drink. They are usually led by an elderly man shouting, "Dikgafela tseo!" A ritual food known as "mokoto" (meat from the cow backbone) is feasted on by men alone, while women feast on meat called "ngati". Dithubaruba also contributes to the socio-economic development of the locals through cultural tourism.
