= Tswana music =

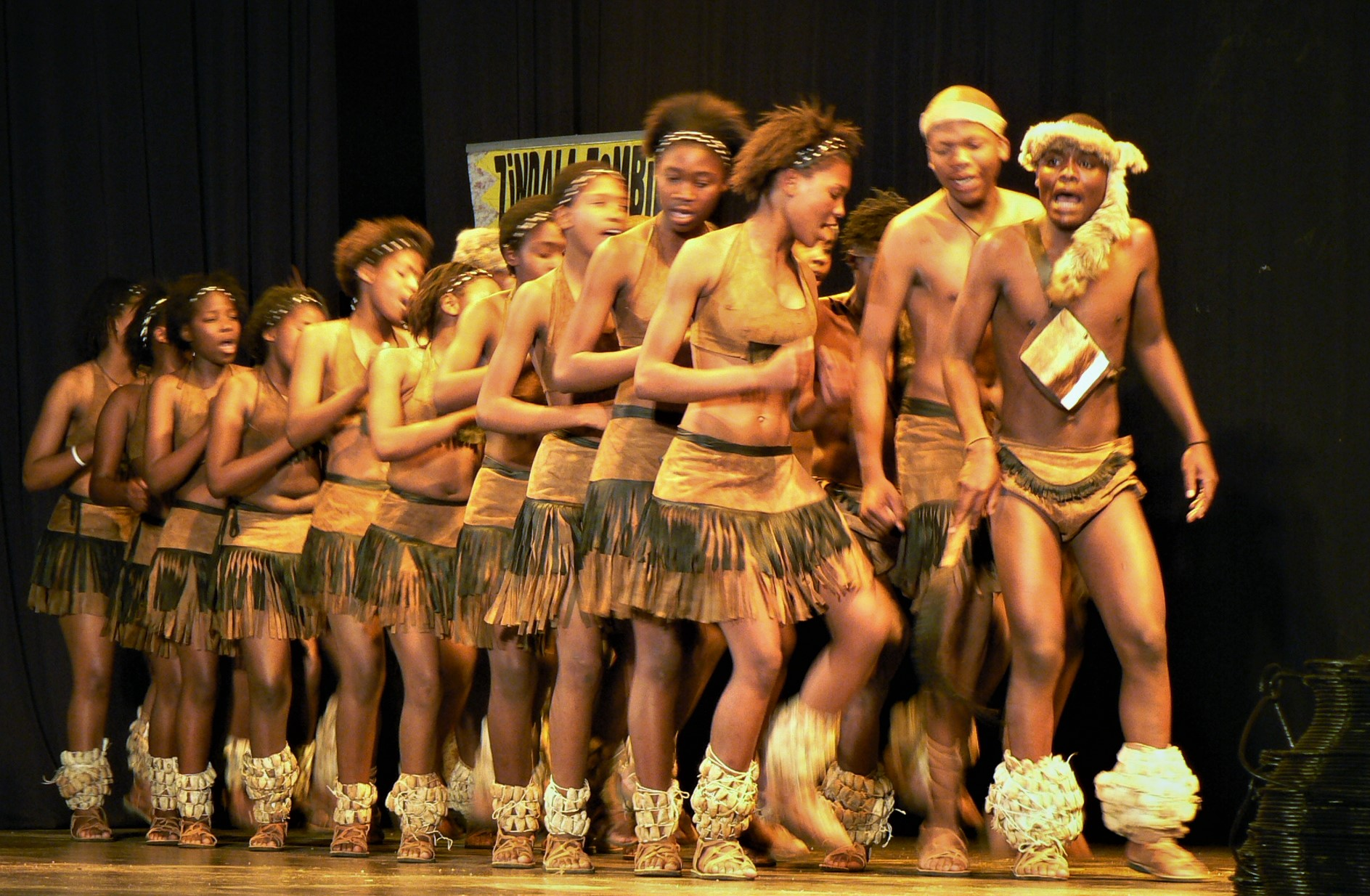
Tswana Dancers 3

Traditional Tswana music is performed by Tswana people during feasts and special occasions such as beer gatherings, weddings and initiation ceremonies. Some of the instruments used include the segaba and setinkane. The segaba is more like a violin, in the design, but uses only one string hooked to a tin. The setinkane is made with varying forks, and played more like a keyboard.

During the colonial era, Tswana folk music was discouraged because it was considered a hindrance in the proper development of the region and people. Since independence for Botswana, folk music has been revived, though still the most popular music is from elsewhere in Africa (especially South Africa), United States and Europe.

Many current music groups in Botswana are performing Tswana music and dance, such as Culture spears, Matsieng, Mokorwana, Ditaola, Mokorwana, Makhirikhiri and many others groups.

== Classification of music ==
Tswana people classify their vocal music as 'dipina' (songs) according to their function within various social institutions for instance, music produced during initiation ceremonies is known as 'moamo'. The performance of much of the Tswana traditional music is related to the agricultural season of the year. The seasons are as follows:

- Letlhafula (Autumn):meaning 'to renew life', a time of hoeing songs and work-party songs;
- Mariga (Winter): meaning 'shade', a time for children's fireside story songs;
- Dikgakologo (Spring): meaning 'to melt away', a time when women and children chase crops by singing in the fields;
- Selemo (Summer): meaning 'to salvage fallen crops from loose soil', a time for beer-brewing, beer-songs and beer-dances.

== Aspects of Tswana music ==
Traditional Tswana communal music is characteristically largely pentatonic, of diversive symmetrical meter performed with much expression and rhythmic bodily movements. Traditional Tswana songs are either 'mainaane a segologolo' which is a 'folklore of great import' or the songs are contemporary, where they originate from a known composer 'motlhami'. The songs may be sung in unison (pina e e kodunngwe) or in two or more parts. Multipart songs are usually in a 'call and response' form where the 'call' is known as 'segalodimo' and the response 'segalo tlase'.

== Musical instruments ==
Tswana Bows There are 4 main types of bows used by the Tswana people namely the lengope, senwana, setinkane and nokukwane

Lengope- This bow consists of a curved length of cane strung with nylon fishing rod. The 'lengope' is mouth resonated, fingered with the left hand and plucked with the right forefinger.

Sengwana- This bow is calabash-resonated, stick-struck, and has its cord divided unequally so as to produce a 2 tones, a minor third apart. The effect of variations in tone quality is made by the performer raising and lowering the calabash opening against their chest. This bow a much larger than the 'lengope'

Setinkane - The 'setinkane' is similar to the 'sengwana' but it does not have a resonator.

Nokukwane- This bow was obtained by the Korana people and the Tswana people are the only Bantu people who use it. The bow is simple however, its arc is more pronounced that the other bows.

Other musical instruments:

- The Tswana drum (moropa), antelope horn (lepapata), and leg rattles (mathlo) are most often used during group dancing.
- The Tswana people also have a large variation of whistles named according to their construction namely 'lengwane', 'lethlaka noka', 'mothlatsa', 'naka', and 'palo llo'.
