= Late Pleistocene =

Third division (unofficial) of the Pleistocene Epoch

Late/Upper Pleistocene
- 0.129 – 0.0117 Ma
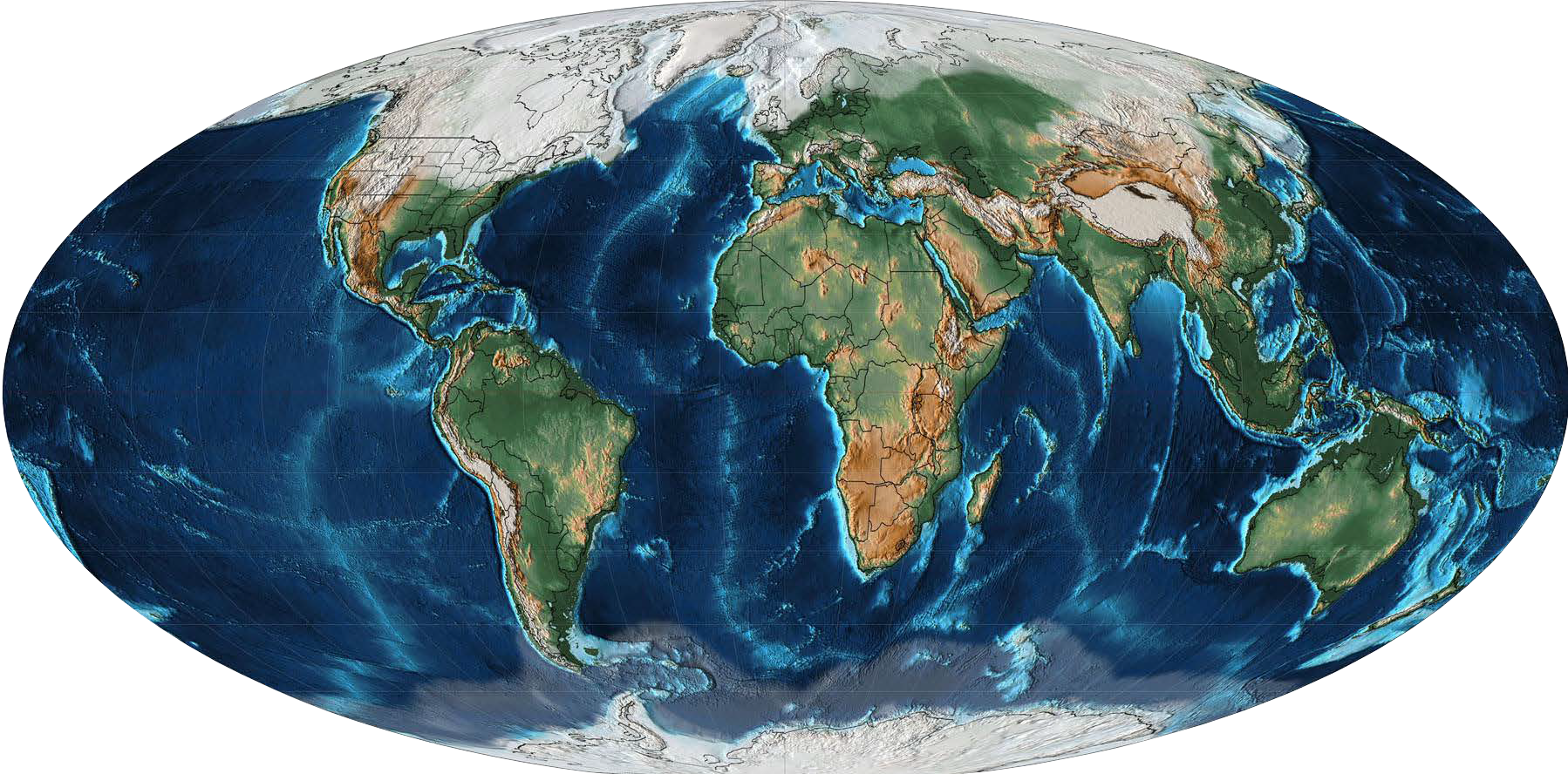
- A map of Earth as it appeared approximately 21,000 years ago at the peak of the Last Glacial Maximum

Chronology
← / Holocene
Subdivision of the Quaternary according to the ICS, as of 2024. Vertical axis scale: Millions of years ago

Etymology
- Name formality: Informal
- Proposed name(s): Tarantian

Usage information
- Celestial body: Earth
- Regional usage: Global (ICS)
- Time scale(s) used: ICS Time Scale

Definition
- Chronological unit: Age
- Stratigraphic unit: Stage
- Time span formality: Formal
- Lower boundary definition: Not formally defined
- Lower boundary definition candidates: Marine Isotope Substage 5e
- Lower boundary GSSP candidate section(s): None
- Upper boundary definition: End of the Younger Dryas stadial
- Upper boundary GSSP: NGRIP2 ice core, Greenland; 75.1000°N 42.3200°W
- Upper GSSP ratified: 14 June 2018 (as base of Greenlandian)

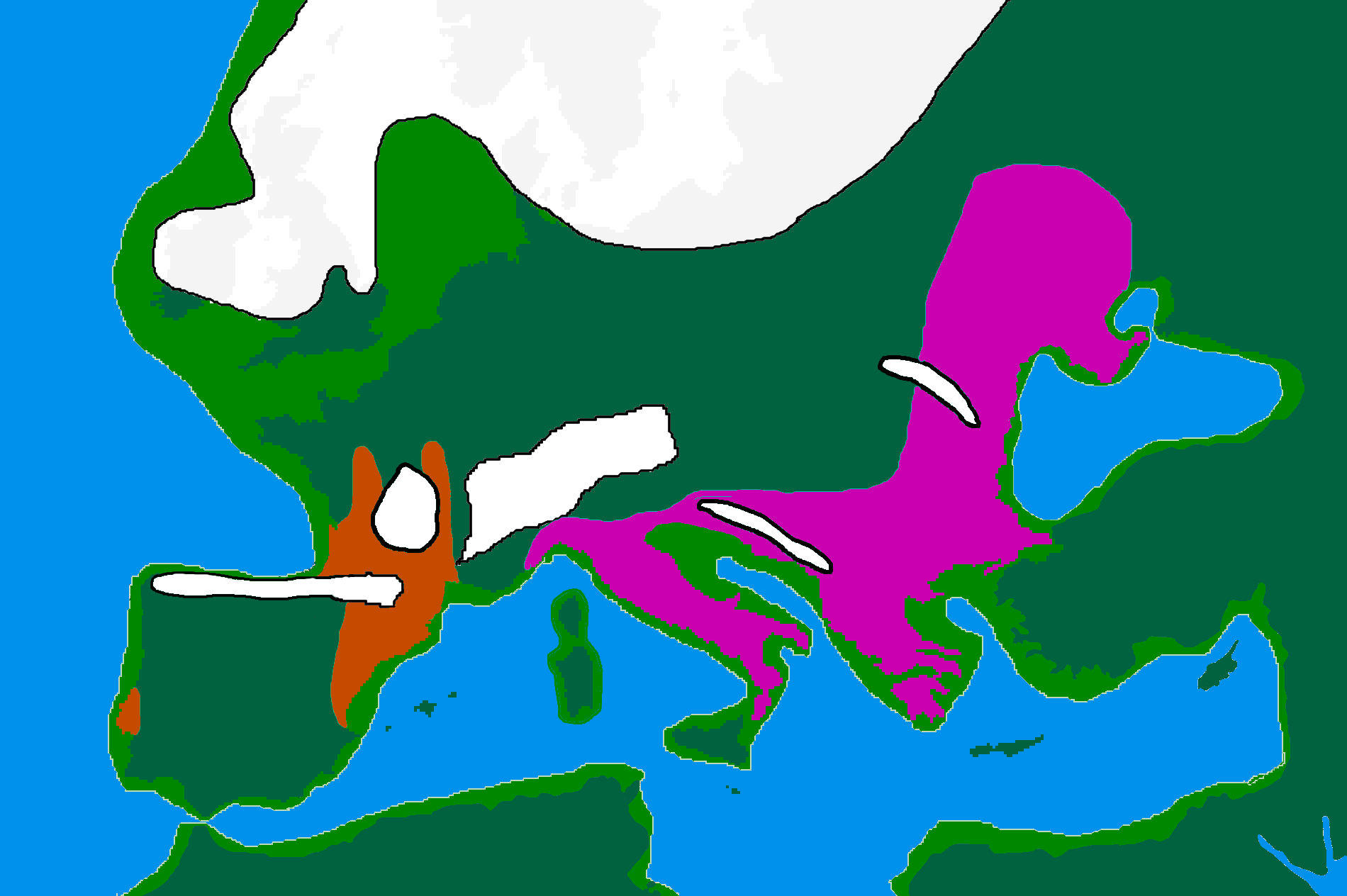
The Last Glacial Maximum refugia, c. 20,000 years ago Solutrean culture Epigravettian culture

The Late Pleistocene is an unofficial age in the international geologic timescale in chronostratigraphy, also known as the Upper Pleistocene from a stratigraphic perspective. It is intended to be the fourth division of the Pleistocene Epoch within the ongoing Quaternary Period. It is currently defined as the time between c. 129,000 and c. 11,700 years ago. The late Pleistocene equates to the proposed Tarantian Age of the geologic time scale, preceded by the officially ratified Chibanian (commonly known as the Middle Pleistocene). The beginning of the Late Pleistocene is the transition between the end of the Penultimate Glacial Period and the beginning of the Last Interglacial around 130,000 years ago (corresponding with the beginning of Marine Isotope Stage 5). The Late Pleistocene ends with the termination of the Younger Dryas, some 11,700 years ago when the Holocene Epoch began.

The term Upper Pleistocene is currently in use as a provisional or "quasi-formal" designation by the International Union of Geological Sciences (IUGS). Although the three oldest ages of the Pleistocene (the Gelasian, the Calabrian and the Chibanian) have been officially defined, the late Pleistocene has yet to be formally defined.

Following the brief Last Interglacial warm period (~130–115,000 years ago), where temperatures were comparable to or warmer than the Holocene, the Late Pleistocene was dominated by the cool Last Glacial Period, with temperatures gradually lowering throughout the period, reaching their lowest during the Last Glacial Maximum around 26–20,000 years ago.

In palaeoanthropology, the Late Pleistocene contains the Upper Palaeolithic stage of human development, including the early human migrations of modern humans outside of Africa, and the extinction of all archaic human species.

The Late Pleistocene from around 50,000 years ago onwards was marked by the extinction of most large terrestrial animals outside of Africa, an extinction event otherwise unprecedented in the geological record due to its extreme size bias. Most authors suggest that climate change, the expansion of modern humans, or the combination of both were the likely causes of the extinctions.

== Last Ice Age ==
The proposed beginning of the late Pleistocene is the end of the Penultimate Glacial Period (PGP) 126 ka when the Riß glaciation (Alpine) was being succeeded by the Eemian (Riß-Würm) interglacial period. The Riß-Würm ended 115 ka with the onset of the Last Glacial Period (LGP) which is known in Europe as the Würm (Alpine) or Devensian (Great Britain) or Weichselian glaciation (northern Europe); these are broadly equated with the Wisconsin glaciation (North America), though technically that began much later.

The Last Glacial Maximum was reached during the later millennia of the Würm/Weichselian, estimated between 26 ka and 19 ka when deglaciation began in the Northern Hemisphere. The Würm/Weichselian endured until 16 ka with Northern Europe, including most of Great Britain, covered by an ice sheet. The glaciers reached Long Island NY (which is the terminal moraine and several recessional moraines) in North America. Sea levels fell and two land bridges were temporarily in existence that had significance for human migration: Doggerland, which connected Great Britain to mainland Europe; and the Bering land bridge which joined Alaska to Siberia.

The last Ice Age was followed by the Late Glacial Interstadial, a period of global warming to 12.9 ka, and the Younger Dryas, a return to glacial conditions until 11.7 ka. Paleoclimatology holds that there was a sequence of stadials and interstadials from about 16 ka until the end of the Pleistocene. These were the Oldest Dryas (stadial), the Bølling oscillation (interstadial), the Older Dryas (stadial), the Allerød oscillation (interstadial) and finally the Younger Dryas.

The end of the Younger Dryas marks the boundary between the Pleistocene and Holocene Epochs. Hominids in all parts of the world were still culturally and technologically in the Palaeolithic (Old Stone) Age. Tools and weapons were basic stone or wooden implements. Nomadic tribes followed moving herds. Non-nomadics acquired their food by gathering and hunting.

== Africa ==
Its present physical geography and climate have changed over time caused by the movement of tectonic plates and volcanoes but glacial cycles and sea level variation have a more significant effect on the vertebrate communities during the Late Pleistocene.

The Late Pleistocene was the time when most animals evolved to resemble modern-day animals and they managed to live through the Late mid-Pleistocene since there were no extinction events of megafauna until the end of the Late Pleistocene.

Some species which went extinct at the end of the Late Pleistocene in Southern Africa are the giant warthog, long-horn buffalo and the Southern springbok. These species were common because their distribution changed in response to climatic influences on vegetation. Carnivores were more widespread due to their varying habitat requirements.

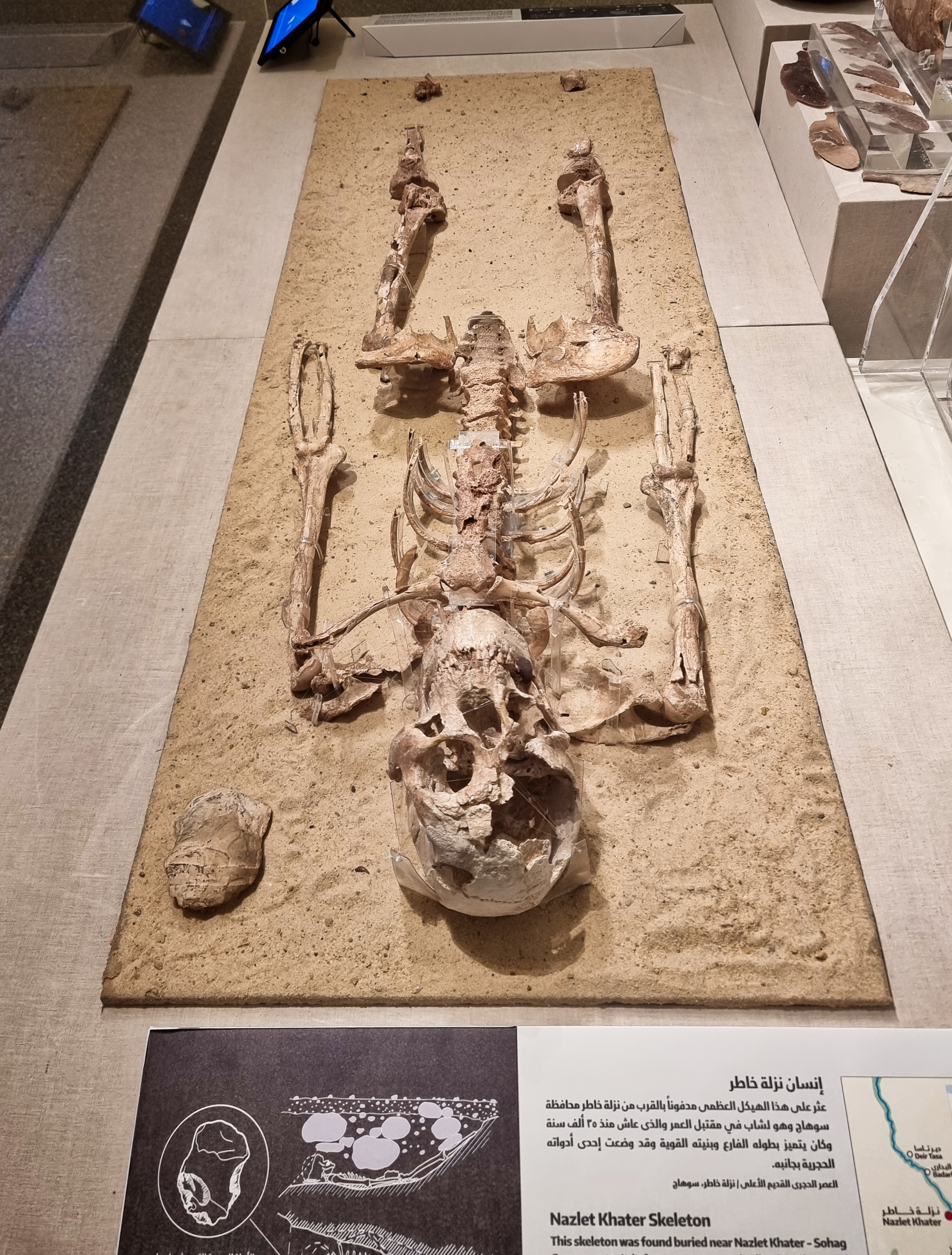
Image of Nazlet Khater skeleton found in Upper Egypt showing early human culture dating back to approximately 30–40 Ka

In Egypt, the Late (or Upper) Palaeolithic began sometime after 30,000 BC. People in North Africa had relocated to the Nile Valley as the Sahara was transformed from grassland to desert. The Nazlet Khater skeleton was found in 1980 and has been radiocarbon dated to between 30,360 and 35,100 years ago.

Most of the knowledge of the Late Pleistocene is obtained from regions like Morocco, Algeria, Tunisia, some coastal regions of Maghreb, Libya and Egypt. The only issue with interpreting the data from this region is due to the lack of chronological information. The resemblance of Late Pleistocene species in Northern Africa to modern animals is the same as in Southern Africa but it's extremely difficult to date when these fauna came into place because of the lack of reliable samples from the mid-Pleistocene. Most of the significant fossil records are from the Maghreb because of its geology which helps to create deep caves which is conducive for preserving fossils.

== Eurasia ==
Neanderthal hominins (Homo neanderthalensis) inhabited Eurasia until becoming extinct between 40 and 30 ka, towards the end of the Pleistocene and possibly into the early Holoceneand were replaced with modern humans (Homo sapiens) who emerged from East Africa about 195,000 years ago. Neanderthals co-existed with the Homo sapiens until they died out.

In Eurasia, extinction happened throughout the Pleistocene but those that happened during the Later Pleistocene were of megafauna and there were no replacements for the extinct species. Some Molluscan species went extinct but not on the same scale as the mammals living during the time. Some examples of species which extinct without replacements include the Straight-tusked elephant (Palaeoloxodon antiquus), Giant deer (Megaloceros giganteus), cave bear (Ursus spelaeus) and woolly rhinoceros (Coelodonta antiquitatis). Several large mammalian species including the mammoth, mastodon, and Irish elk became extinct.

Upper Paleolithic people also made paintings and engravings on walls. Cave paintings have been found at Lascaux in the Dordogne which may be more than 17,000 years old. These are mainly buffalo, deer, and other animals hunted by humans. Later paintings occur in caves throughout the world, including Altamira, Spain, and in India, Australia, and the Sahara.

Magdalenian hunter-gatherers were widespread in western Europe about 20–12.500 cal BP years ago until the end of the Pleistocene. An example of this is the antler-working done by the human groups who lived in the Santimamine cave in the Magdalenian. They invented the earliest known harpoons using reindeer horn.

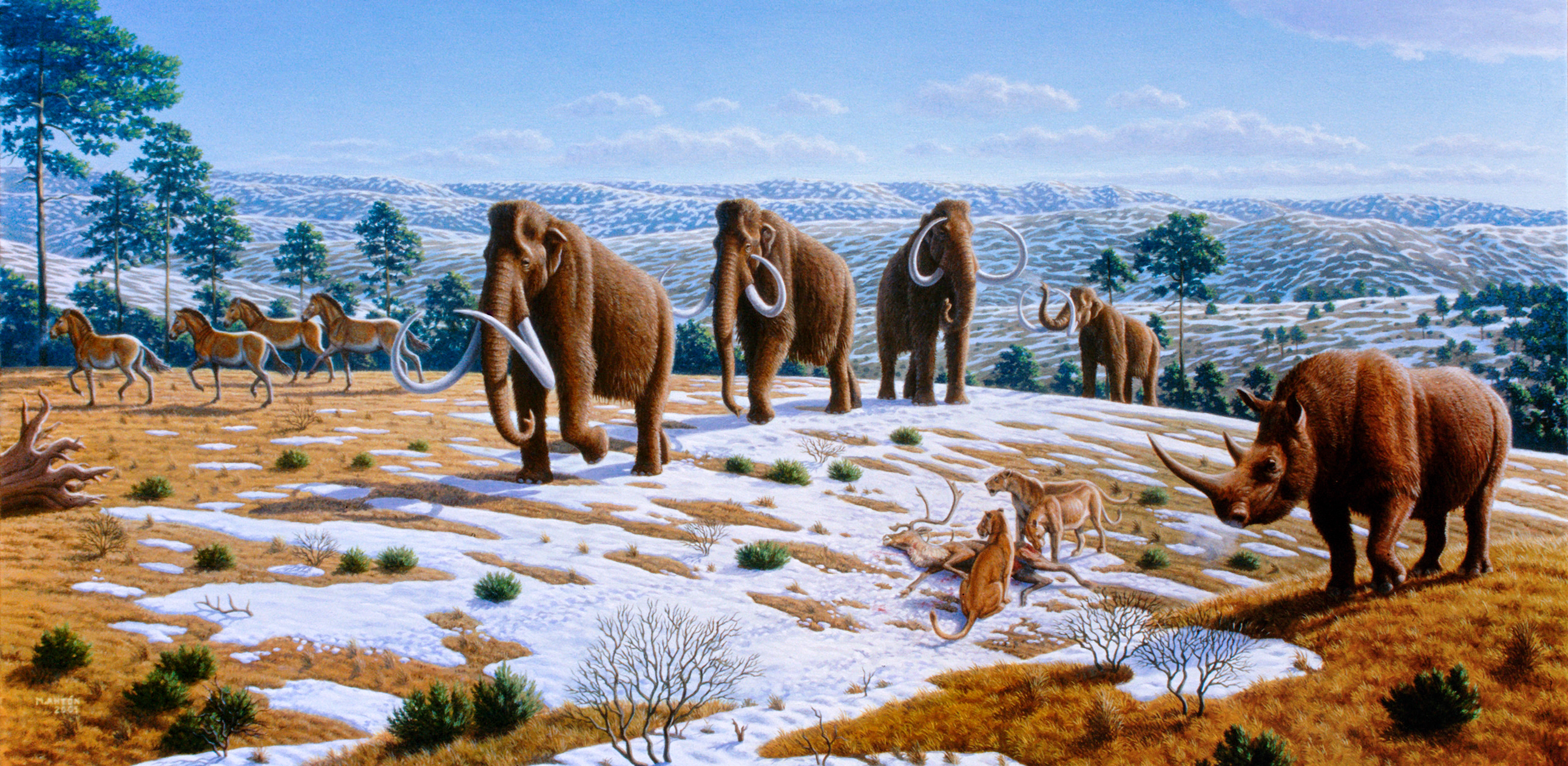
Late Pleistocene in northern Spain. Left to right: wild horse, woolly mammoth, reindeer, cave lion, woolly rhinoceros.

Climatic conditions during the Late Pleistocene in Eurasia were predominantly cold with glaciation events happening in northern Europe, northwest Siberia and the Alps and interglacials (temperate phase). The evidence of the changes in climatic conditions was from fragmentary sequences in formerly glaciated areas in northern Europe.

The only domesticated animal in the Pleistocene was the dog, which evolved from the grey wolf into its many modern breeds. It is believed that the grey wolf became associated with hunter-gatherer tribes around 15 Ka. The earliest remains of a true domestic dog have been dated to 14,200 years ago. Domestication first happened in Eurasia but could have been anywhere from Western Europe to East Asia. Domestication of other animals such as cattle, goats, pigs, and sheep did not begin until the Holocene when settled farming communities became established in the Near East. The cat was probably not domesticated before c. 7500 BC at the earliest, again in the Near East.

A butchered brown bear patella found in Alice and Gwendoline Cave in County Clare and dated to 10,860 to 10,641 BC indicates the first known human activity in Ireland.

== Far East ==
The topography and geography of Asia were subject to frequent changes such as the creation of land bridges when sea levels dropped which helped with the expansion and migration of human populations. The first human habitation in the Japanese archipelago has been traced to prehistoric times between 40,000 BC and 30,000 BC. The earliest fossils are radiocarbon dated to c. 35,000 BC. An archeological record of Neanderthals has been found in Asia along with records of two other hominin populations, the Denisovans and Homo floresiensis.

Japan was once linked to the Asian mainland by land bridges via Hokkaido and Sakhalin Island to the north but was unconnected at this time when the main islands of Hokkaido, Honshu, Kyushu and Shikoku were all separate entities.

== North America ==
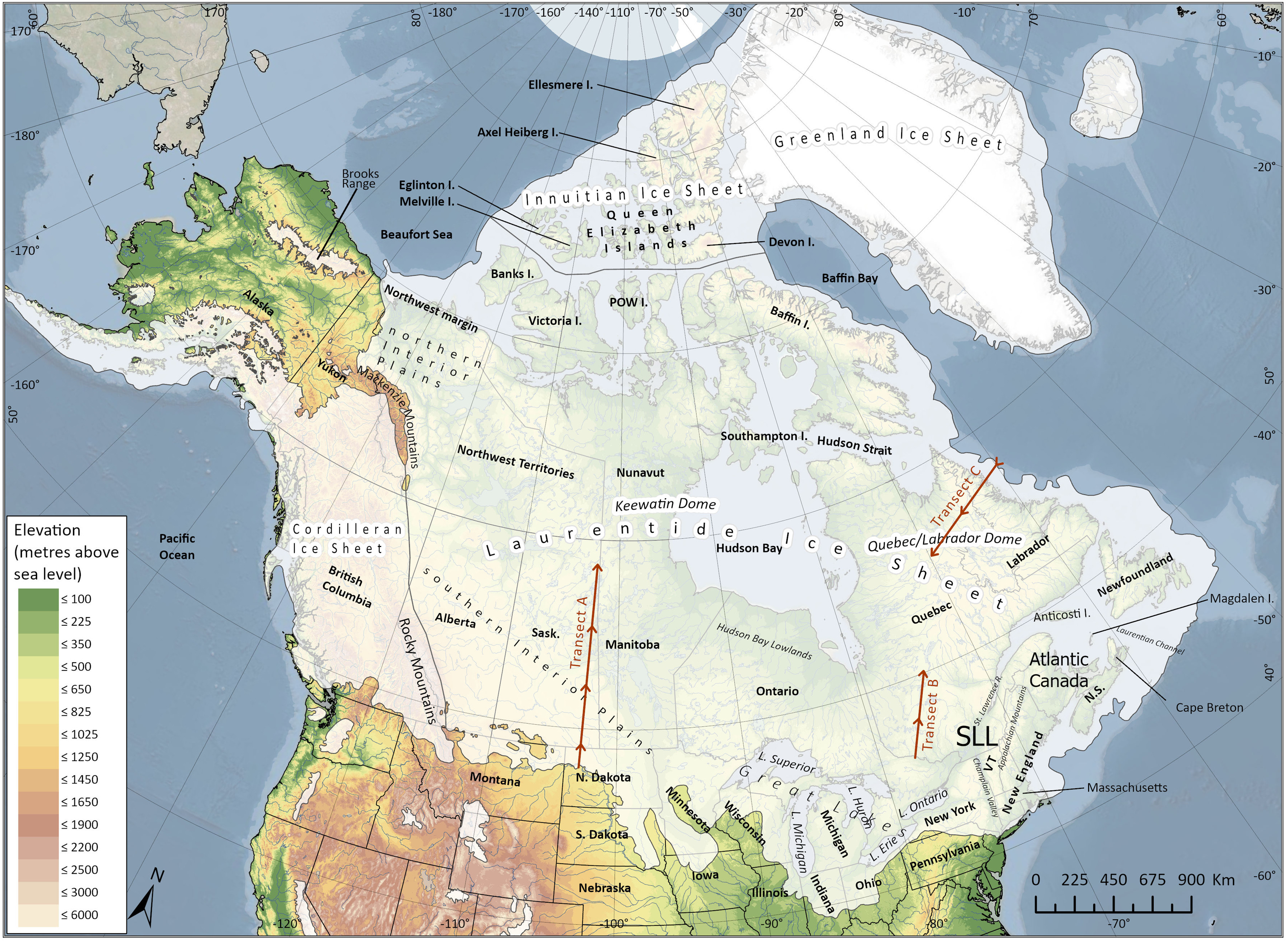
The maximum extent of North American ice sheets during the Last Glacial Maximum c. 20,000 years ago

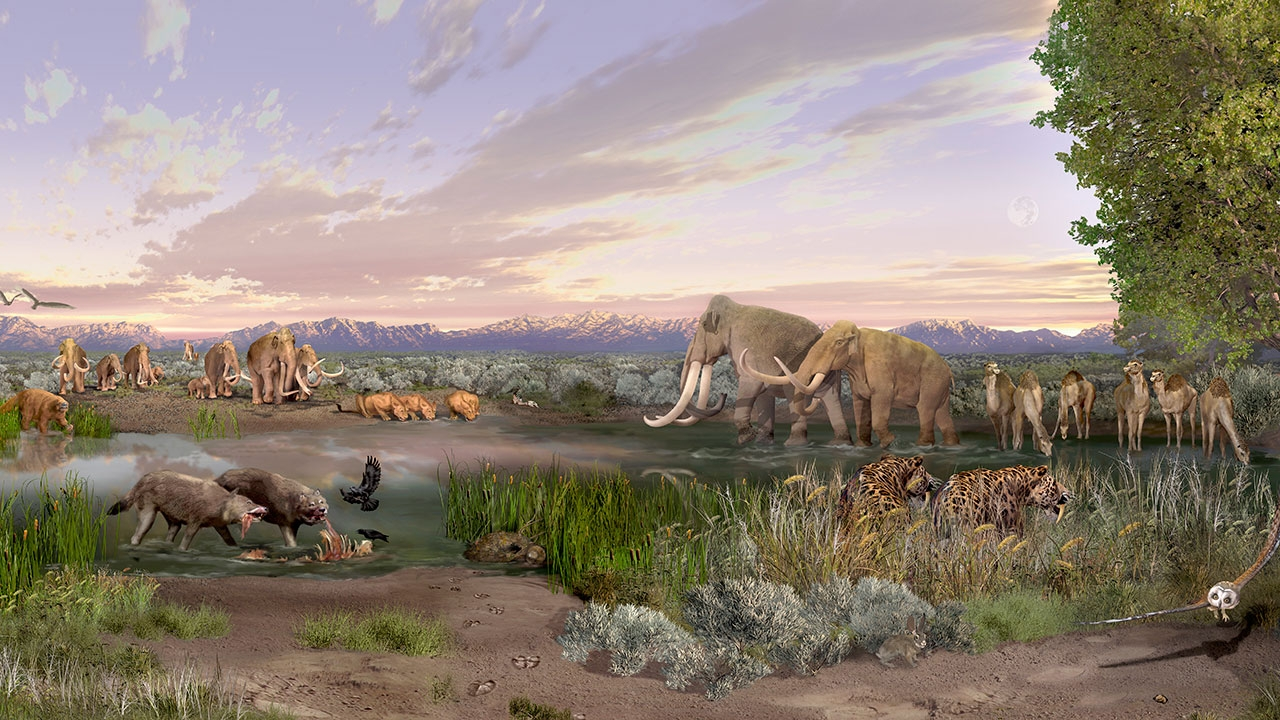
Environment of what is now White Sands National Park in New Mexico, with Columbian mammoths, a ground sloth, dire wolves, lions, camels, and saber-toothed cats.

Human migrations happened during this time with people coming in from Eurasia. From about 28 ka, there were migrations across the Bering land bridge from Siberia to Alaska. The people became the Native Americans. It is believed that the original tribes subsequently moved down to Central and South America under pressure from later migrations.

In the North American land mammal age scale, the Rancholabrean spans the time from c. 240,000 years ago to c. 11,000 years ago. It is named after the Rancho La Brea fossil site in California, characterized by extinct forms of bison in association with other Pleistocene species such as the mammoth.

During the Late Pleistocene about 35 genera of megafauna went extinct including species such as mastodons, saber-toothed cats and giant ground sloths. Some other species went extinct in North America but not globally. it is still heavily debated what caused the extinctions.

Bison occidentalis and Bison antiquus, an extinct relative of the smaller present-day American bison, survived the late Pleistocene period, between about 12 and 11 ka ago. Clovis people depended on these bison as their major food source. Earlier kills of camels, horses, and muskoxen found at Wally's beach were dated to 13.1–13.3 ka B.P.

== South America ==
Over 50 genera (~ 83%) of megafauna in South and North America went extinct during the Pleistocene. Most mega mammals (>1000 kg) and large mammals (>40 kg) went extinct by the end of the Late Pleistocene. During this period there was a major cooling event called the Younger Dryas and the Clovis culture of capturing game became more prominent. Diverse factors such as climate change may have triggered this extinction but it's still in debate what the major factors were.

The Late Pleistocene saw a change in the use of coastal resources and advancements in marine technology. The reasons for these changes have not been confirmed; various triggering mechanisms have been theorized such as climate change, the arrival of new people, or the struggle for resources.

The South American land mammal age, the Lujanian, corresponds with the late Pleistocene. The Lujanian is a geologic period from 0.8 - 0.11Ma specifically for prehistoric South American fauna.

== Oceania ==
Map of Sahul with Sunda

There is evidence of human habitation in mainland Australia, Indonesia, New Guinea and Tasmania from c. 45,000 BC. The finds include rock engravings, stone tools and evidence of cave habitation.

In Australia, there are sites which show evidence of pollen records from the Late Pleistocene and they are mostly found in more temperate regions of the continent. Some megafauna decreased in size over time, while others remained the same; however, the fossil record is limited in the exact chronologies of the extinctions.

Extinction of Australian megafauna appears to have taken place earlier than in the Americas or the extinction of the Eurasian mammoth steppe fauna, with an estimated peak of extinction of around 42,000 years ago. In general, various reasons have been stated to have caused the extinctions during the Late Pleistocene but the topic is still being debated.

== Bibliography ==
- Bronowski, Jacob (1973). The Ascent of Man. London: BBC. ISBN 978-1-849-90115-4.
- Roberts, J. M. (1993). Shorter Illustrated History of the World. Abingdon: Helicon Publishing Ltd. ISBN 0-1951-1504-X.
- Teeple, John B. (2002). Timelines of World History. London: Dorling Kindersley Ltd. ISBN 0-75133-742-0.
