= Antidorcas australis =

Antidorcas australis Temporal range: Pleistocene - Holocene

Scientific classification
- Domain: Eukaryota
- Kingdom: Animalia
- Phylum: Chordata
- Class: Mammalia
- Order: Artiodactyla
- Family: Bovidae
- Subfamily: Antilopinae
- Tribe: Antilopini
- Genus: Antidorcas
- Species: †A. australis

Binomial name
- †Antidorcas australis (Hendey, 1968)

Extinct species of antelope

Antidorcas australis, also known as the southern springbok, is an extinct species of antelope from the Pleistocene and Holocene of South Africa. It is a close relative of the living springbok.

== Taxonomy ==
First recovered from Mid Pleistocene deposits at Swartklip along the southern coast of South Africa, the southern springbok was originally described as (and is sometimes still considered) a subspecies of the modern springbok (as Antidorcas marsupialis australis).

It was subsequently elevated to species level, as its presence at Swartkrans suggested a wide temporal and geographic distribution worthy of a valid species, and its taxonomic validity was further strengthened when remains were found together with Antidorcas recki, the presumed ancestor of modern springbok, in Early-Mid Pleistocene deposits.

The genus Antidorcas evolved from an ancestral Gazella species more than 3 million years ago in East Africa and gave rise to A. australis, Antidorcas bondi, and A. recki. The southern springbok, along with A. bondi, became extinct perhaps as recently as 7,000 years ago; at a minimum, fossils have been documented in the very latest Pleistocene deposits at Nelson Bay Cave (13,430 to 14,140 BP).

== Paleoecology ==
The southern springbok was associated with open-habitat species such as equids and alcelaphine antelopes. Like extant springbok, the southern springbok was probably a mixed feeder, capable of browsing dicots when grasses became unpalatable or scarce.

== See also ==
Megalotragus, another extinct African antelope from the Pleistocene-Holocene border.
