= Setapa =

Botswanan traditional dance

Setapa is a traditional music dance which originates from the Bangwaketse tribe of Kanye village and surrounding areas in Botswana, such as Sesung, Selokolela and Molapo wa Basadi villages. Setapa traditional dance was started by Bangwaketse in the past and therefore it is regarded as the dance for the tribe. Setapa involves a group of people stamping in to the ground with their feet to the song played or sung by the choir or the group. The word is derived from the Tswana word Go tapa-tapa, which means to step into the ground continuously. Setapa troupes involves an equal mix of both men and women dressed up with the skin of animals. The dance troupes wear brown shells in their feet which gives out a perfect sound as they dance and the males usually carry on whistles and heifer horns to produce sound from the stream of air or as they blow into them.

== Types of Setapa Music Dance ==
Setapa music dance exists in three different types, which are:

- Setapa sa dipitse: this is a kind of dance which is performed and produces the sound of a galloping horse in the ground.
- Setapa sa phathisi: Setapa which is performed whilst the lower part of the trouser is tied with a peg or the use of short pants made of animal skin usually referred to as tshega. This kind of influence of tying a knot in a trouser using a peg was adopted from the Bakwena tribe dance known as Phathisi.
- Setapa sa go goga maoto: The kind of Bangwaketse dance is performed by dragging feet on the ground. Go goga maoto is a Tswana phrase which means to drag feet. The dance is adopted from the neighbourhood tribe Basarwa dance called tsutsube. The cause of dance adoption in the three types mentioned is sharing of borders between districts.

== Setapa costume ==
Setapa troupes wear flip flops called diphamphathana made of tyres, and knee shin guard like made of animal skins including the hare and antelope, spring boks and duikers. The trousers used by men are called motseto and also made of antelope skin, they are usually cut short or rolled up to the knee level to allow for the shin and diphamphathana.
Traditionally, ladies put on the traditional skirts made of animal skin known as Diphaeyana. The skin is usually selected from animals such as phuti (duiker), phuduhudu and tshepe. The females never used diphamphathana like males instead they used some sandals made from an oxen head skin. The females sandals were called Dikhube in Tswana. Setapa Costume ended in the olden days, nowadays the Setapa generation put on some fashion clothes such as some prints by Germans, whilst males put on some fashion blazers and formal trousers and they use their leg rattles to produce rattling sound as they dance.
