= Ramkie =

African type of guitar

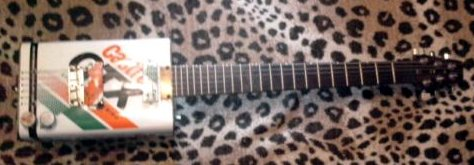
- A 6 string fretted Ramkie.

String instrument
- Classification: String instrument
- Hornbostel–Sachs classification: (Composite chordophone)
- Developed: South Africa

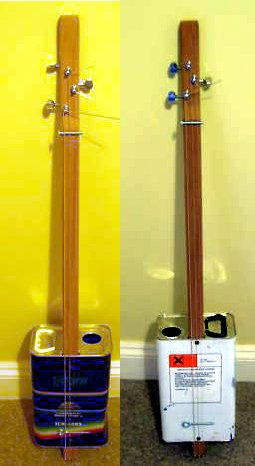
A pair of 3 string fretless Ramkies.

The Ramkie (also called an Afri-can) is a type of guitar usually made in South Africa, Botswana, Zambia, Namibia and Malawi. It is made using a discarded oil can (or similar) for the soundbox. It has three or four strings (rarely six like a guitar), made of fishing wire or bicycle brake wire, and may be fretted or fretless. The instrument has apparently always been used for repetitive chord-playing, not melodic patterns.

== History ==
The instrument is recorded as early as 1730 among the Khoikhoi people in the Cape, although its earlier history is unclear. Such early ramkies had a gourd for its body. The name probably comes from Portuguese "rabequinha" ("little violin"). It was later adapted by the San and Bantu speakers, and the gourd body replaced by wood or a tin can.

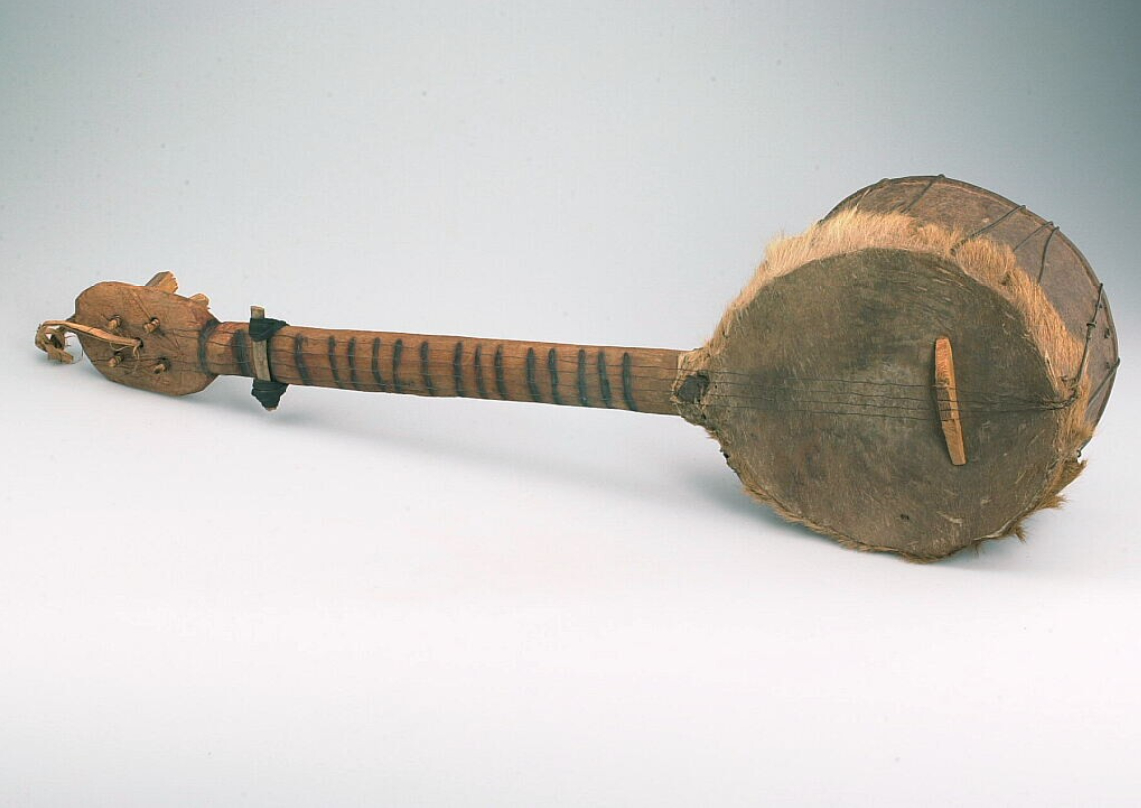
Ramkie, pre-1974, Rhodesia, Zambia.

== See also ==
- Segankuru. Fiddle made similarly to Ramkie, from Southern Africa.
