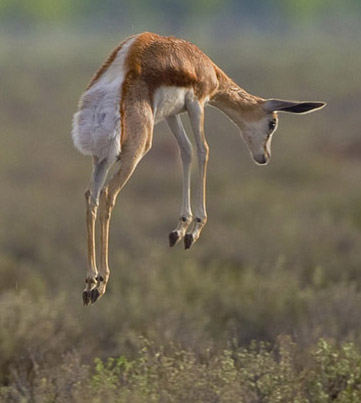

Scientific classification
- Kingdom: Animalia
- Phylum: Chordata
- Class: Mammalia
- Order: Artiodactyla
- Family: Bovidae
- Subfamily: Antilopinae
- Tribe: Antilopini
- Genus: Antidorcas; Sundevall, 1847

Type species
- Antidorcas marsupialis (Zimmermann, 1780)

Species
- 1 living, several extinct (see text)

= Antidorcas =

Antidorcas Temporal range: 5.3–0 Ma Pliocene–Recent

Genus of mammals

Antidorcas is a genus of antelope that includes the living springbok and several fossil species.

== Modern Taxonomy ==
In 2013, Eva Verena Bärmann (of the University of Cambridge) and colleagues undertook a revision of the phylogeny of the tribe Antilopini on the basis of nuclear and mitochondrial data. They showed that the springbok and the gerenuk (Litocranius walleri) form a clade with saiga (Saiga tatarica) as sister taxon. The study pointed out that the saiga and the springbok could be considerably different from the rest of the antilopines; a 2007 phylogenetic study even suggested that the two form a clade sister to the gerenuk. The cladogram below is based on the 2013 study.

- - - - - - Gazelle (Gazella)
          - Blackbuck (Antilope cervicapra)
        - - Nanger
          - Eudorcas
      - - Springbok (Antidorcas marsupialis)
        - Gerenuk (Litocranius walleri)
  - Saiga (Saiga tatarica)

== Species ==
- Antidorcas marsupialis - Springbok
- †Antidorcas australis
- †Antidorcas bondi
- †Antidorcas recki
