= List of museums in Botswana =

This is a list of museums in Botswana.

== List ==
- Botswana National Museum
- Kgosi Bathoen II (Segopotso) Museum
- Kgosi Sechele I Museum
- Khama III Memorial Museum
- Nhabe Museum
- Phuthadikobo Museum
- Supa Ngwao Museum
- Nhabe Museum
- Khama III Museum in Serowe

== See also ==
- List of museums
