= Ndazola =

Traditional dance in Botswana

Ndazola is a Botswanan traditional dance practiced by the Kalanga people. Ndazola is common in the northern parts of Botswana which includes Palapye, Francistown, Mathangwane, Goshwe, Tonota and others.
