= Borankana =

Traditional music in Botswana

Borankana refers to a traditional music in Botswana which is usually practiced or performed by Bakwena tribe in the Kweneng District of Botswana (Molepolole). Borankana is strongly connected to the culture of Botswana.The other used name for Borankana is Phathisi. Borankana is traditionally performed by both elderly people and young people. According to history, Borankana was performed during tribal activities only. It is believed according to history that only man and boys were the ones dancing whilst the females sang, clapped hands and Ululated during performances.

== Origins of Phathisi/ Borankana ==
Borankana performances are estimated to have initiated by the year 1914 and 1916. According to history Phathisi came from a man tying down the lowest part of his trouser using a peg when he cycles. In the past, man used to work in mines using their bicycles and for one man to own a bicycle they have to be wealthy enough to be able to purchase one, and the trouser had to be tied hard to avoid toppling of the rider or the trouser being hooked by the chain. The same process of trouser pegging was used when performing Borankana.It was changed from pegging the lower part of the trouser to using shorts when performing the Borankana.
