= Antidorcas bondi =

Antidorcas bondi Temporal range: Pliocene - Holocene 5.3–0.007 Ma

Scientific classification
- Domain: Eukaryota
- Kingdom: Animalia
- Phylum: Chordata
- Class: Mammalia
- Order: Artiodactyla
- Family: Bovidae
- Subfamily: Antilopinae
- Tribe: Antilopini
- Genus: Antidorcas
- Species: †A. bondi

Binomial name
- †Antidorcas bondi (Cooke and Wells, 1951)

Synonyms
- Gazella bondi

Extinct species of antelope

Antidorcas bondi, or Bond's springbok, is an extinct species of antelope whose fossils have been found in Zimbabwe and South Africa.

== Description ==
Originally described as a species of gazelle, it was found to be related to the modern springbok based on cranial morphology. Due to its exceptionally hypsodont teeth, together with isotopic evidence, Bond's springbok is considered a specialized grazer.

Bond's springbok survived past the Pleistocene in South Africa, surviving until as recently as 5,000 BC.
