= Moteane Melamu =

Moteane John Melamu is a writer and academic from Botswana. He is a professor at the University of Botswana.

== Works ==
- Children of the Twilight, short stories ISBN 0-86543-678-9
- Living and Partly Living, short stories ISBN 1-86867-059-7
