= Antidorcas recki =

Antidorcas recki Temporal range: Pliocene–Pleistocene

Scientific classification
- Kingdom: Animalia
- Phylum: Chordata
- Class: Mammalia
- Order: Artiodactyla
- Family: Bovidae
- Subfamily: Antilopinae
- Genus: Antidorcas
- Species: A. recki

Binomial name
- Antidorcas recki (Schwarz, 1932)

Synonyms
- Adenota recki (Schwarz, 1932); Phenacotragus recki Schwarz, 1937; Gazella wellsi Gentry, 1966

Extinct species of antelope

Antidorcas recki is an extinct species of gazelle, related to the extant springbok, from the Pliocene and Pleistocene of southern and eastern Africa.

== Taxonomy ==
Antidorcas recki was named in 1932 by Schwarz, and assigned to Adenota. It was subsequently reassigned to its own genus, Phenacotragus, also by Schwarz. In 1965, Louis Leakey referred two cranial fragments from Olduvai Gorge to Phenacotragus. Alan William Gentry later wrote about gazelle material recovered from Olduvai, assigning several skull fragments to Gazella wellsi. He noted the similarities between G. wellsi and P. recki, and suggested they be sunk into the genus Antidorcas, but hesitated to synonymise them. However, personal communications with Elisabeth Vrba suggest that he intended to at a later date. Gentry later did so, forming the combination Antidorcas recki.

== Description ==
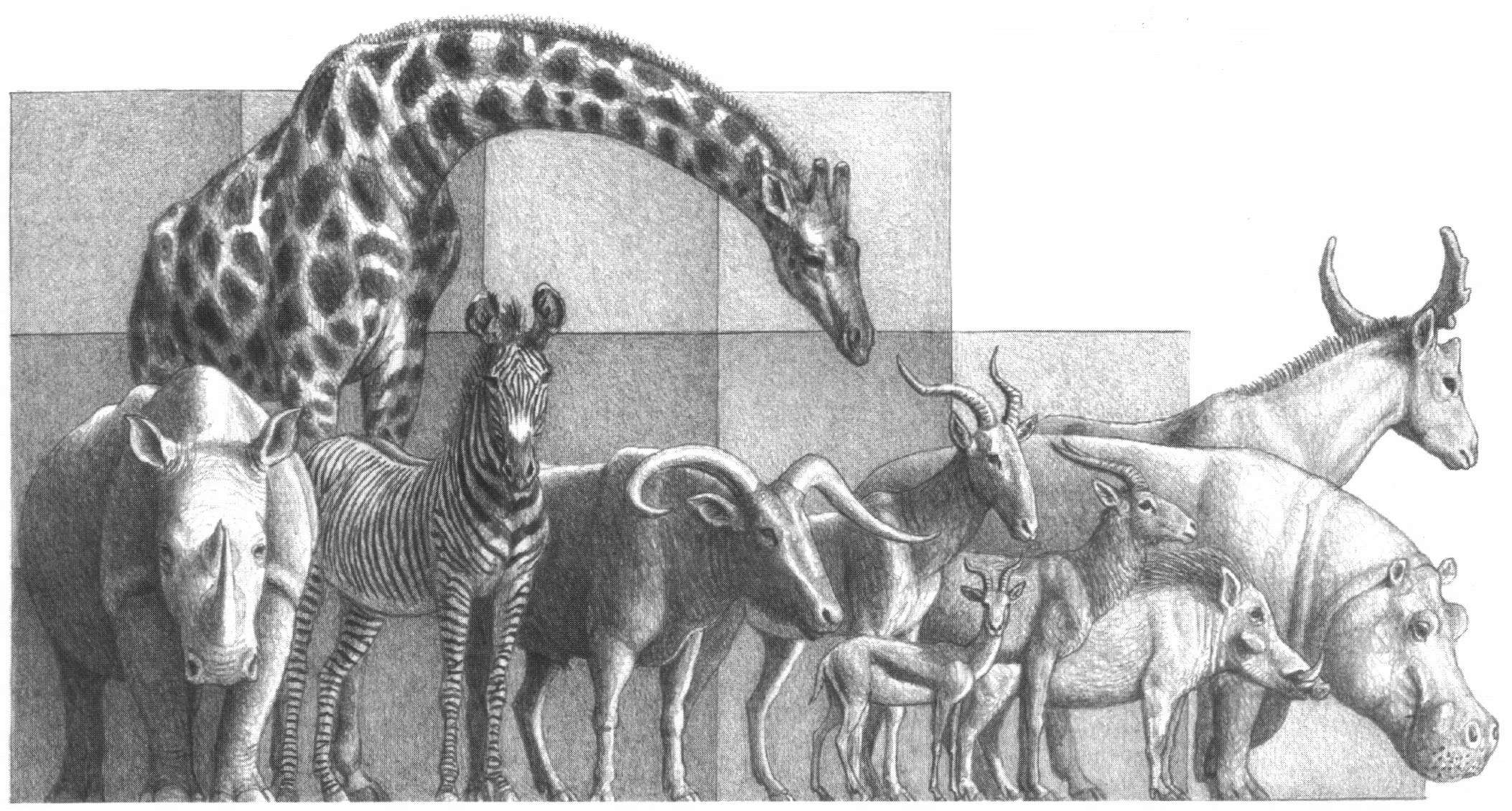
Ungulates from the Pleistocene of Eastern Africa, including A. recki (smallest)

Similar to the modern springbok, Antidorcas recki was sexually dimorphic, with males having flattened horn cores that bent backwards sharply, and females having slender, straight cores with a round cross-section. It may have been more sexually dimorphic than its living relative.
