= Kgosi Sechele I Museum =

National museum in Molepolole, Botswana

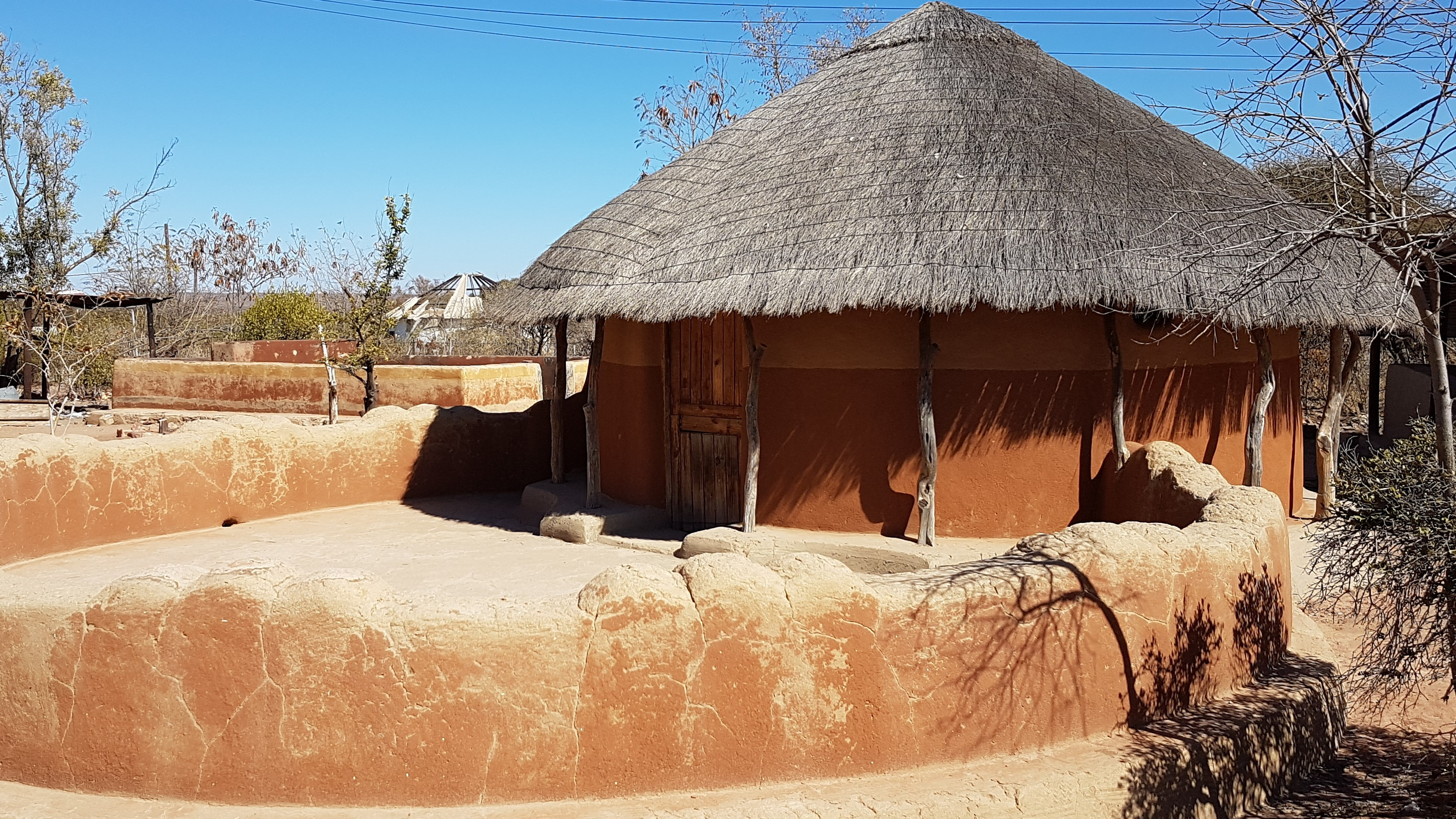
- Traditional Setswana house
- Established: 1902
- Location: Molepolole, Botswana
- Coordinates: 24°24′24″S 25°29′42″E
- Collection size: Cultural preservation
- Website: List of museums in Botswana

The Kgosi Sechele I Museum is a national museum located in Molepolole, Botswana. The museum was founded in 1902 and was made open to the public in 1992. Highlights include much memorabilia relating to the famous explorer David Livingstone (1813 to 1873). It is named for Kgosi Sechele I.

== History ==
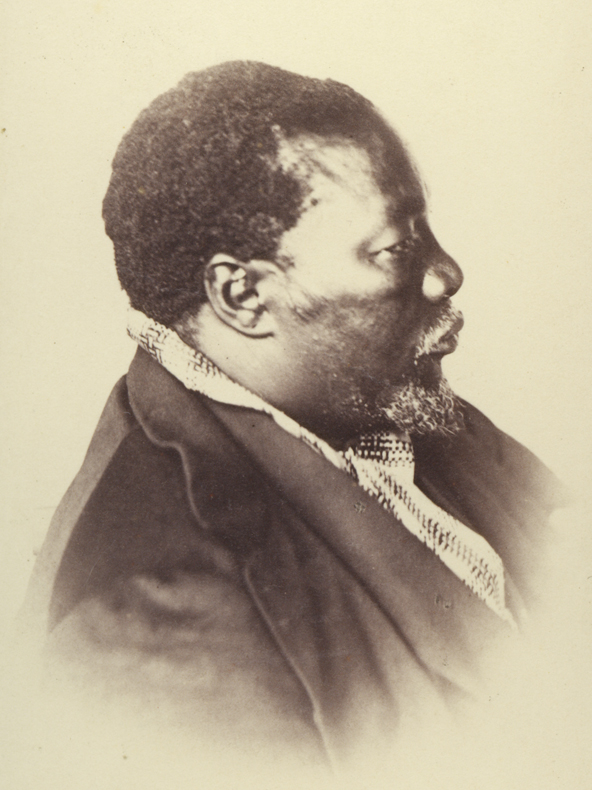
Kgosi Sechele I

Kgosi Sechele Museum preserves and promotes the culture of Botswana. It was founded in 1902 and had its building being constructed by the kweneng district people of Molepolole. The construction is made in the old historical buildings and was declared open to the public in 1992 and also a national museum.
