= Tsutsube =

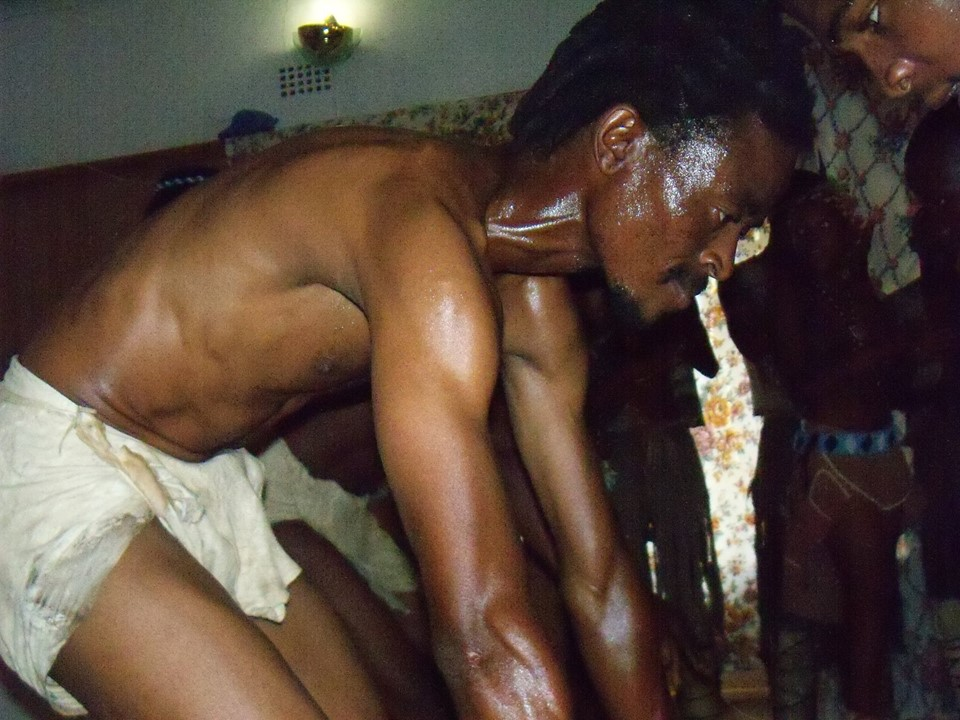
- Genre: Traditional dance
- Origin: Botswana

Tsutsube is a traditional dance and accompanying music in Botswana which is practiced by Basarwa or San people. Tsutsube is performed in four ritualistic categories or stages which are the first kill, puberty, marriage and trance. According to the history, the first kill was for males or boys, and trance dance was for healing purposes to engage ancestors spirits.

== Origin ==
Tsutsube was originally a dance genre that was associated with the Ghanzi and the Kgalagadi regions but it has now spread around most parts of the country. It is now performed in different areas of Botswana and some areas parts of the North West province of South Africa.
