= Segankuru =

The segankuru is a bowed trough zither, bar zither or musical bow, a string instrument found in Botswana and other areas of South Africa, and found under many names. It consists of a wooden body attached to a tin can resonator, with a single metal string played with a bow. The instruments main role is for self or group entertainment for young men, while herding cattle, etc.

It is known as the segaba, sebinjolo and segankuru among the Tswana people, the sekgobogobo or setseketseke among the Pedi people. Also called the setinkane or stinkane.

== Characteristics ==
=== Type A ===
The instrument consists of a long straight stick, carved with a trough in the top, strung with a string from the end of the instrument to a tuning peg at the top, and a 5-liter sized metal can covering the bottom of the instrument (and flattened to hold it on). The trough is carved into the stick to change the sound. The tin can acts as a resonator. An instrument might be 86 Cm long x 6 cm wide. It is played with a bow, made from a stick and strung with animal hair. The instrument has been used in the past using the musicians mouth as a resonator. Rings can be attached to the instrument to vibrate as it is played.

Because of the trough, this can be considered a trough zither. It could also be considered a bar zither. It is too inflexible to be considered a musical bow.

=== Type B ===
This instrument uses a one-gallon sized can for a resonator. The stick is inserted through the pouring hole and bent into an arch. The top of the stick is tied to a hole in the can by the string or wire. A sound hole is in the side. It is played with a bow.

Without a trough, this isn't a trough zither. This instrument could be considered a musical bow or a pluriarc played with a bow. However, with only one arm, it would be a uniarc.

=== Type C ===
Also called sebinjola. This instrument resembled type A, a straight stick. However, the instrument lacks a trough and is shorter.

This could be considered a bar zither. It is too inflexible to be considered a musical bow. With a trough, it could be considered a trough zither.

=== Fiddle ===
Segaba has also been used to refer to a fiddle.

== See also ==
- Ramkie. South African plucked lute made from oil can.
