= Culture Spears =

Tswana music group based in Botswana

- Origin: Botswana
- Genres: Traditional music
- Years active: 1991–present
- Labels: Kulenyane Studios
- Members: Kabelo Mogwe, Magdalene Lesolebe
- Website: http://www.culturespears.biz

Culture Spears is a Tswana traditional music group based in Botswana. It is also a traditional dance group.

== Albums and accolades ==
Culture Spears have released four albums: Korone, Kulenyane, Khudu, Kuweletsana and Kulanche. Kulenyane sold over 60,000 units within three months and won several awards. This hit album was produced by Zimbabwean producer Johane Maseko (known as "Joe Maseko") at his House of the Rising Sound in Gwabalanda township, Bulawayo (Zimbabwe's second capital). Culture Spears would maintain an on and off relationship with Maseko.

The group played at prominent events in and outside Botswana, winning numerous awards and becoming one of the most successful groups in the country's local music industry. Culture Spears was given the Presidential Award of Merit. In 2008 they were invited by the South African president Thabo Mbeki to perform for him.

== Discography ==
=== Kulenyane ===
No.	Title	Length
1.	"Borikiriki"	05:19
2.	"Nchadinyana"	05:15
3.	"Kulenyane"	05:15
4.	"Mmapula"	06:34
5.	"Remmogo"	05:02

=== Khudu ===
No.	Title	Length
1.	"Jeremane"	05:24
2.	"Bodimo"	05:22
3.	"Khudu"	05:20
4.	"Seru"	05:07
5.	"Kgasa"	05:14
6.	"Moruti"	05:09

=== Kuweletsana ===
No.	Title	Length
1.	"Shadime"	06:09
2.	"Kentane"	05:49
3.	"Kuweletsana"	05:52
4.	"Ring E Kae"	05:48
5.	"Hosana"	05:52
6.	"Re Buile"	05:31

=== Didimala Moratiwa ===
No.	Title	Length
1.	"Didimala Moratiwa"	05:38
2.	"Sibi"	04:38
3.	"Mamoleane"	04:52
4.	"Bantomo"	05:11
5.	"Tumelo"	04:42
6.	"Marabele"	04:28

== Hits ==
"Kulenyane" was the first traditional song to be played on urban radios stations which used to shun traditional music. The song's popularity saw the late South African DJ Bujo Mujoreproducing "Kulenyane" as a house song, while another renowned South African gospel musician, Solly Moholo, bought the rights of the song to make his own "Mokhukhu" version of it.

"Khudu" won the Song of the Year and Best Video of the Year awards at the Botswana Music Union awards in 2010.

== Kulenyane Studios ==
The group founded its own recording studio, Kulenyane Studios, named after their second album, reportedly the leading Culture Spears project in terms of sales. The studio is headquartered in Culture Spears' mansion in the heart of Gaborone.

=== Media coverage ===
According to Botswana Youth Magazine, the group have made headlines in the media for both good and bad reasons, from the lead singer's divorcing (Kabelo Morwa Mogwe was married to Magdeline Lesolebe), to other members exiting the group.
