= Literature of Botswana =

Most literature in Botswana is written in English, however, many works are published in Setswana and a small minority are published in other native languages.

Economic challenges faced by authors affect publishing and a wider production of literature in Botswana. Books are often unavailable to citizens and authors generally make little money, especially with non-English writings. In a Writers' Workshop held in Maun, Lauri Kubuetsile said there are few publishing houses which turn out to be very expensive. She said it is also hard for local writers to do self publishing as they have to absorb all the publishing costs.

Fables have existed through oral literature since ancient times, and praise poems became a common way to recount a person's life and accomplishments. The arrival of European missionaries in the 19th century brought changes to literature in present-day Botswana. Robert Moffat introduced a standardised orthography for Setswana in 1826 when he translated several Christian texts and a dictionary into the language. Explorers and colonists wrote many travel books about the region throughout the century. Mass media developed toward the end of the 19th century as Christian newsletters were distributed. The establishment of Pius XII College in 1945 allowed the British colonial administration to introduce English-language literature to the nation, beginning a lasting debate over the roles of English literature versus those of native languages in Botswana.

Many newspapers began publication as Botswana moved toward independence in the 1960s. Upon independence, Botswana became a member of the Berne Convention by adopting the British Copyright Act 1956. Bessie Head became the first internationally recognised Motswana writer in the mid-20th century, followed by Unity Dow at the end of the century. Both of these authors used their works to comment on Women's Rights and the role of women in Africa. Other authors, such as Andrew Sesinyi, Galesiti Baruti, and Mositi Torontle, explored the clash between traditional values and modernism after Botswana achieved independence. Several foreign novels have been set in Botswana, traditionally portraying the country as an empty wilderness in the Kalahari Desert or as a means for white people to find meaning in a new setting. The No. 1 Ladies' Detective Agency by Alexander McCall Smith presents a more nuanced portrayal of the nation and became a central aspect of Botswana's image in the Western world.

== Languages and literacy ==
Most literature in Botswana is written in English, which makes works accessible for a broader audience. Much of the remainder is written in Setswana. These two languages dominate life in Botswana, and other native languages see little use. English literature became common in urban areas relatively quickly, while Setswana remained common in rural areas. Educational materials, religious texts, and works of fiction make up the most common forms of literature using the Setswana language. Poetry and drama are more commonly written in Setswana, and dramas are typically performed instead of read. English is associated with higher education and social status, so most technical works are written in English. Political separation of the Setswana-speaking populations into Botswana, Namibia, and South Africa has further limited the ability of Setswana literature to develop.

Poverty, lack of access to books, and failure to complete school have challenged efforts to improve literacy in Botswana. The lack of publications in minority languages affects literacy rates among their respective speakers, and many native languages had yet to develop a standard orthography by the end of the 20th century, lacking a significant body of dictionaries or other works to codify the language in writing. As of the beginning of the 21st century, scientific writing remained almost non-existent in minority native languages.

Major authors who write in Setswana include Mokgomotso Mogapi, R. D. Molefhe, Matlapeng Ray Molomo, Tiroentle Pheto, Leetile Disang Raditladi, and Cedric Thobega. There is little incentive for writers and publishers to produce literature in native languages besides Setswana; each minority language is only spoken by a small number of people, and they are often in poverty. Because of the nation's multilingual nature and the importance of English in both the private and public sectors, language and literature have historically been taught under the same department at the University of Botswana.

== Oral literature ==
Oral literature has existed for thousands of years in present-day Botswana. The earliest stories, preserved by cave paintings, included fables as well as stories of hunting and shamanism. The history of different tribes, particularly their origins, leaders, settlements, and wars, was preserved through oral literature until the early 19th century. The recitation of history is traditionally associated with veneration of ancestors. The most pervasive oral tradition in Botswana is the Lowe creation myth, which tells that Matsieng emerged from a hole in Lowe to create the animals, and that upon his return the Tswana, San, and Kgalagadi peoples emerged from the hole. It then establishes the Tswana people as the rightful owners of the cattle.

Commonalities exist throughout modern folktales in Botswana. The hare is a common character, portrayed as a trickster or a quick-witted character who uses cleverness to get ahead. The hyena sometimes appears as a stupid and cowardly character. Boer people are used as malevolent figures. The San people have several common folktales. The story of the quagga and the jackal warns against marrying into other cultures when the coyote eats his quagga bride. The story of N/u//goridao explains how humanity learned about sexual intercourse when God carved three vaginas into stone to demonstrate how they were to be used. Another story explains why some of the San kept livestock while others hunted, describing two brothers who chose their respective roles.

When Europeans began documenting the region, they produced few records of oral tradition. David Livingstone complained of how much was forgotten by the time he began researching them in the 19th century, as many stories were lost during the Difaqane. European records of oral literature increased in coverage during the colonial period. Some academics, such as Jean and John Comaroff, have contended that narrative did not exist in Botswana's oral tradition until it was introduced by the Western world. This has been challenged by academics such as Paul Landau and J. D. Y. Peel, and many examples of narrative are apparent when a broader definition is used.

Storytelling is a common family pastime in rural Botswana where access to mass media is limited. These stories can be fiction or nonfiction, and they may be performed by the storyteller as they mimic the people or animals.

=== Praise poetry ===
Praise poems, or maboko, document the subject's life and accomplishments. In the 19th century, boys were expected to write and memorise an autobiographical praise poem, or leina, for himself as part of the bogwera coming-of-age rite. A collective poem would also be written for the entire regiment that was coming of age. These poems were used across every social class, and a social identity was developed as a man added to his poem throughout his life.

Praise poems are written in blank verse. They were often performed publicly, where speakers would improvise the phrasing and structure in response to the audience. According to the 19th century British ethnologist Andrew Smith, members of the Kwena tribe settled arguments by reciting their poems and then repeating the poems of their opponent from memory. Other praise poems were written to celebrate prominent figures such as chiefs, or sometimes to subtly criticise or give other commentary.

The earliest written record of a praise poem dates to 1801, but they were not commonly documented until the early 20th century, meaning that poems for ancient figures shrank over time as verses were lost to history. The poems are often long and complex, incorporating metaphors, literary references, and historical analogies that make them difficult to understand without prior knowledge. In the 21st century, praise poems are traditionally read during the coronation of a kgosi, and a broader tradition of poetic language in public speaking remains part of Botswana's culture.

== Written literature ==
=== European contact and the Bechuanaland Protectorate ===
A standardised orthography developed relatively late in Setswana language writing, a consequence of the various independent Setswana tribes. The first text that sought to create a uniform orthography was written by Robert Moffat by 1826. With a printing press that he brought to Kuruman, Moffat translated several religious works into Setswana, including the gospels, a book of hymns, lessons in Biblical scripture, and The Pilgrim's Progress. Moffat worked on a Setswana translation of the New Testament for 23 years, from 1817 to 1840. He also published a Setswana dictionary.

The South African writers Silas Molema and Sol Plaatje became major figures in the region's literature following World War I. They produced English language works providing political commentary about African identity. Molema published Bantu Past and Present in 1920 as a glamorised depiction of history before moving on to more academic historic works. Plaatje published the novel Mhudi in 1930, considering themes related to the growing colonial infrastructure in southern Africa through the setting of the 19th century Difaqane. He also centred Tswana women in the story, having them represent the potential of a just society in the region. Writers of the later colonial period include Simon Ratshosa, K. T. Motsete, and Leetile Disang Raditladi, all of whom wrote toward the idea of a unified Setswana identity.

=== Post-colonial literature ===
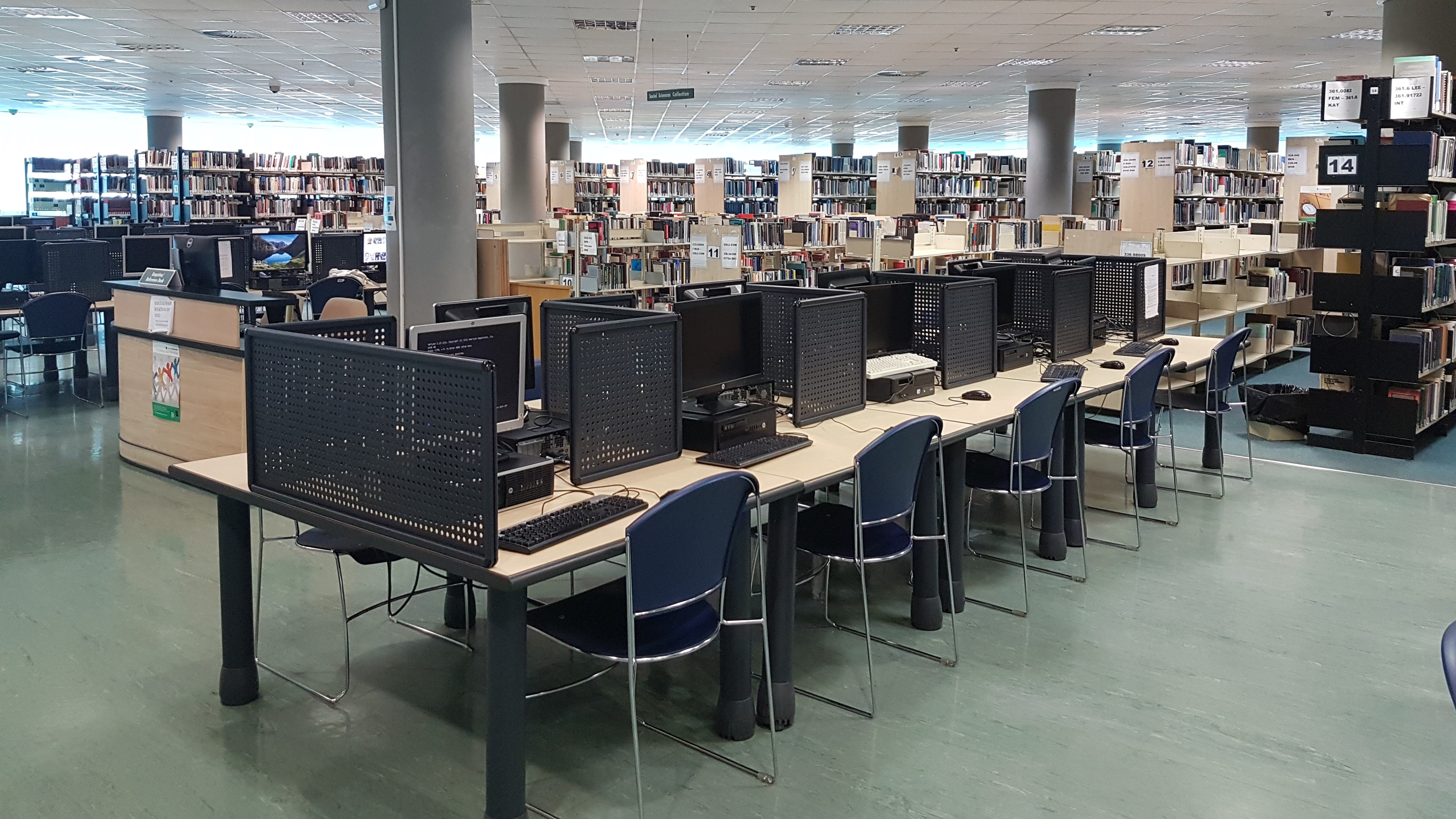
The University of Botswana library in 2020

Bessie Head became the most well-known writer from Botswana globally, and her work is often used internationally in university-level women's literature and African literature studies. A native of South Africa, Head migrated to Serowe, Botswana, to avoid persecution as a Coloured person in Apartheid South Africa. Initially writing without focus on a specific idea, Head's narratives became more defined and consistent when she moved to Botswana. She developed a sense of continuity centred on Serowe in both her fiction and nonfiction works, creating a reimagining of the area where social justice is affirmed. Her writing often focused on the life of women in Africa. Among her most popular novels are When Rain Clouds Gather (1968), Maru (1971), and A Question of Power (1974). While her work is also taught at schools in Botswana, she does not have the same recognition domestically.

The decades following independence brought new issues to literature in Botswana as the country formed a national identity. Philosophical debate emerged around the nature of morality in Botswana, fought between adherents of pre-colonial traditions and supporters of modernist society. The ill-defined identity of being Motswana became a regular subject as memories of democratic pre-colonial tribes were revitalised as the Batswana created a single democratic nation. Changing morality in postcolonial Africa became a common theme across the continent as nations were decolonised, which gave rise to pan-African literature. As with much of African literature, that of Botswana developed a moralising tone to emphasise cultural awareness and present these ideas directly.

Authors such as Andrew Sesinyi and Galesiti Baruti wrote critically about modern society in Botswana, contrasting it with an idealised vision of the past. Sesinyi's Love on the Rocks (1981) was the first major English language novel published in independent Botswana. The story follows a man from a poor rural family who goes to the University of Botswana, where he meets and begins a romantic relationship with an upper class urban woman. Sesinyi ended the story with all characters resolving their disagreements after accepting traditional Tswana morality. Many books by other authors follow a similar pattern, such as the Setswana language book No Sweet without Sweat. Sesinyi's subsequent books, Rassie (1989) and Carjack (1999) also explore themes of wealth inequality and moral corruption in modern society.

Mositi Torontle explored themes of urbanisation in Botswana similar to Sesinyi. He considered rural life and access to education in The Victims (1993). Torontle diverged from most literature about Botswana by presenting the land as welcoming instead of inhospitable. Barolong Seboni, who grew up in London, wrote about the exploration of national self-identity. Moteane Melamu and Caitlin Davies built on this genre in the next generation of writers. Caleb Nondo, a family physician, produced the pamphlet Lethal Virus (1998) that blends fictional narrative with medical information about HIV/AIDS.

A rise in women writers by the end of the 20th century introduced literary criticism of forced marriage and domestic violence, among other women's issues. Unity Dow was the second fiction writer to achieve international acclaim after Bessie Head. As with Head, Dow wrote of a Botswana with potential for a strong sense of social justice. Her work is influenced by her years as a women's rights activist as well as her legal career. Dow's book Far and Beyon' portrays the effects of HIV/AIDS in Botswana and to analyse how it is affected by patriarchy. She then used the detective novel The Screaming of the Innocent to challenge Botswana's traditional conceptions of morality and justice, the coming-of-age novel Juggling Truths to contrast the things taught at home versus those taught in schools, and the novel The Heavens May Fall to describe failures in the justice system's treatment of women in Botswana.

== Publication ==
The first Setswana publisher was Kuruman Press, established by the London Missionary Society in 1830 to publish Christian texts for the Tswana people. Over the following decades, it began publishing Setswana language newspapers, dictionaries, and textbooks. It was later given to the Tiger Kloof Educational Institute in South Africa, but the organisation fled from Apartheid South Africa to Botswana in 1958. The Botswana Book Centre was then created as a non-profit under the United Congregational Church of Southern Africa, and Kuruman Press was succeeded by Pula Press.

The government became the nation's largest publisher after independence, producing records and reports for official business as well as copies of the Botswana Daily News. It was followed by the University of Botswana, primarily through the working papers and research notes published by its National Institute for Research and Documentation. The third largest publisher in the early decades of Botswana was the Botswana Society, including the journal Botswana Notes and Records.

Until the 1970s, publications in Botswana were printed using cyclostyle duplication for governmental and educational works and letterpress printing for works imported from South Africa. As Botswana became wealthier, these were phased out in favour of offset printing. The scientific journal Pula began publication in 1979 to print articles about economics, education, humanities, and social sciences in Botswana. The Writers Association of Botswana was founded in 1981.

Several educational publishers established branches in Botswana after independence. Longman Botswana was created as part of Longman Lesotho, and Heinemann Boleswa began operation in Botswana. Macmillan Botswana was created as an offshoot of Eswatini's Macmillan Boleswa in 1982 and became the nation's largest educational publisher over the following years. In 1984, Education for Development in Botswana became the first book to be entirely typed, bound, and published in Botswana. A non-governmental organisation to promote the interests of the San people, the Kuru Development Trust, published Voices of the San (2004).

Several cultural factors can dissuade writers and publishers in Botswana. Reading is not a frequent habit in the country, in part because of high illiteracy, resulting in lower sales. Books are relatively cheap compared to other African countries, meaning lower earnings for publishers. In 2002, a typical educational or local publication cost about 14–16 pula (2–3 USD).

== News and mass media ==
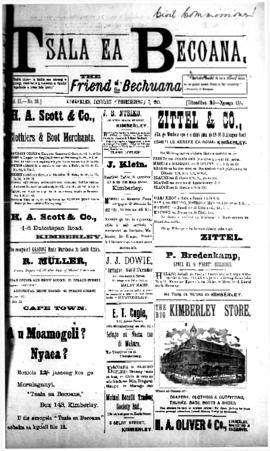
The first issue of the Setswana language newspaper Tsala ea Becauna (1910)

Christian newsletters were circulated in present-day Botswana through the late 19th and early 20th centuries, including Molekodi wa Batswana (transl. Batswana Information) and Mahoko a Botswana (transl. Words of Botswana). The colonial government published several newspapers in the early 20th century, including the Bechuanaland Gazette, Bechuanaland News, and the Vryburg Chronicle. Sol Plaatje founded the first commercial Setswana newspaper, Korante oa Bechoana (transl. Newspaper of Batswana) in 1901.

The colonial government began publication of the bilingual English/Setswana magazine Kutlwano (transl. Mutual Understanding) in 1963, and publication continued after independence. It began publication of the Bechuanaland Newsletter the same year, which became the Bechuanaland Daily News in 1965 and the Botswana Daily News in 1966. With political parties came party-sponsored newsletters in the 1960s, such as Therisanyo (transl. Consultation) for the Botswana Democratic Party and Puo-Phaa for the Botswana National Front.

Unlike many of its neighbours in Africa, Botswana developed strong freedom of the press following independence and allowed publications critical of the government, though most outlets were controlled by the government until the rise of private publications in the 1980s. These included Dumela (1981), the Botswana Guardian (1982), and Mmegi wa Dikgang (1984), among many others. Newslink began publication in 1990, but an investigation by Mmegi uncovered that it was covertly run by Apartheid South Africa's National Intelligence Service. By the 2000s, the only major Setswana language newspaper in Botswana was Mokgosi.

== Foreign literature ==
=== Colonial publications ===
Among English works, literature about Botswana by foreigners developed more quickly than a domestic corpus. Many Europeans wrote travel books in the mid 19th century after visiting Botswana, including Labours and Scenes in South Africa (1842) by Robert Moffat, The Lion Hunter of South Africa (1856) by Roualeyn George Gordon-Cumming, Missionary Travels and Researches in South Africa (1858) by David Livingstone, Travels in the Interior of Africa, 1849–1863 (1868) by James Chapman, and the unpublished Hunter and Explorer by William Cotton Oswell. Such books continued to appear through the end of the 19th century. Travel books gave way to diaries and memoirs in the 20th century, such as those of Charles Rey, a British resident commissioner for the Bechuanaland Protectorate. The only other significant works published about present-day Botswana at this time were scientific, particularly in the field of anthropology.

One of the earliest historical books was Three Great African Chiefs: Khamé, Sebéle and Bathoeng, published by the London Missionary Society in 1895. This book inspired a popular myth that the Bakwena, the Bangwaketse, and the Bangwato were descended from three brothers of the same names. The colonial government published a history of chiefly succession in southern Africa, The Native Tribes of the Transvaal, in 1904. The London Missionary Society published a history book geared toward students, the edited volume Diňwao leha e le Dipololelo kaga Dico tsa Secwana by Reverend A. J. Wookey, in 1913. This became a foundational work in combining the varied histories of different groups in the region toward a single shared heritage.

Throughout the 1930s, the colonial government collected histories from different tribes. This led to the publication of Ditirafalo tsa Merafhe ya Batswana ba Lefatshe le Tshireletso (transl. History of the Tribes of the Bechuanaland Protectorate) and Mekgwa le Melao ya Batswana (transl. Customs and Laws of the Batswana) by Isaac Schapera via Lovedale Press in 1940. The former was written by colonial officers and anthropologists, and the latter was written by native Batswana. Anthony Sillery published a history of the nation, The Bechuanaland Protectorate, in 1952. This text combined the history of missionary and colonial activity in the region with the domestic history covered in the 1913 and 1940 history texts.

=== Fiction and literary study ===
British literature was introduced to present-day Botswana while it was under British rule, and it was the core literary curriculum when Pius XII College was established in 1945. This was replaced with a focus on African literature when Pius XII College was succeeded by the University of Basutoland, Bechuanaland, and Swaziland. The balance of Western and African literature has remained a subject of interest for education in Botswana.

Jules Verne set The Adventures of Three Englishmen and Three Russians in South Africa, one of his Voyages extraordinaires adventure novels, in the Kalahari Desert. His portrayal of the region as an exotic land became standard in the genre. It was further developed by other adventure novelists who set their stories in Botswana, including Nicholas Monsarrat in the 1950s after his work in Johannesburg with the British diplomatic service, and K. R. Butler in the 1960s. Adventure novels set in independent Botswana often take advantage of its stable democracy, distinguishing it from other African countries that are portrayed as unsafe or poorly managed by the native peoples. A parallel sometimes remains when the native Batswana are portrayed as incapable of maintaining democracy and needing outside assistance.

The British author Naomi Mitchison wrote one of the first foreign novels to portray Botswana in a sympathetic light with When We Became Men (1965). Foreign stories set in Botswana have trended toward a focus on the land, such as the Kalahari Desert and the Okavango Delta, presenting the country as a sparse, hostile land that must be overcome. This is in contrast with domestic stories that see the people as a result of their history instead of their environment. Norman Rush wrote multiple stories set in Botswana after he spent four years in the country as director of its Peace Corps office. His short story collection Whites (1986) and his two novels, Mating (1991) and Mortals (2003), focused on the self-discovery of white visitors to the nation without giving distinct identities to any characters from Botswana.

Alexander McCall Smith's series of mystery novels, The No. 1 Ladies' Detective Agency (1998), made Botswana more well known in the Western world. These novels feature clashes of different moral views and emphasise that African society is more complex than the images of poverty and disease seen in the West, though they also give Western readers a portrayal of the nation that is not representative of typical African literature. Some tourist campaigns in Botswana reference the books to attract tourists who are familiar with the series.

== Law and government ==
Upon independence, Botswana adopted the British Copyright Act 1956 as its own law, including its participation in the Berne Convention. Other relevant laws in the early years of independence include the Printed Publications Act and the 1967 National Library Service Act. The Ministry of Education promotes literacy and the production of literature through its Adult Basic Education Division. The Botswana National Library Services established a village reading room program to provide access to literature for rural villages; 54 villages were covered by 1994.

== See also ==
- Botswana art
- Culture of Botswana
- Education in Botswana
- South African literature
