= Bessie Head =

Botswana writer (1937–1986)

- Head at her typewriter
- Born: Bessie Amelia Emery Head; 6 July 1937; Pietermaritzburg, Natal, Union of South Africa
- Died: 17 April 1986 (aged 48); Serowe, Botswana
- Citizenship: South Africa (until 1964); Botswana (from 1979)
- Occupation: Writer
- Writing career
- Genres: Short fiction; novels; short personal essays
- Notable works: When Rain Clouds Gather (1968); Maru (1971); A Question of Power (1973)

Bessie Amelia Emery Head (6 July 1937 – 17 April 1986) was a South African writer who, though born in South Africa, is usually considered Botswana's most influential writer. She wrote novels, short fiction and autobiographical works that are infused with spiritual questioning and reflection. Notable books by her include When Rain Clouds Gather (1968), Maru (1971) and A Question of Power (1973).

== Biography ==
Bessie Amelia Emery was born in Pietermaritzburg, Union of South Africa, the child of a white woman and a black man at a time when interracial relationships were illegal in South Africa. Bessie's mother, Fiona Emery, from the wealthy South African Birch family, had been hospitalised for several years in mental hospitals following the death of her first child, a boy named Gerald Emery, who died after 8 weeks of birth. She was in the huge mental hospital in Pietermaritzburg when she gave birth to Bessie. Although she was not allowed to keep the child, she did give the daughter her own name. Her father is unknown.

Infant Bessie was first placed with white foster parents on the assumption that she was white. A few weeks later, these parents realised that she was coloured and returned her to the authorities. She was then placed with a mixed-race or "coloured" family, the Heathcotes, in a poor non-white area of Pietermaritzburg. Here, she grew up with a strict foster mother, Nelly Heathcote, and attended the local Catholic Church and primary school. She never quite realised that she was not a Heathcote. She enjoyed a near-normal childhood of her time and place, except that her foster mother resented her love of books.

When Bessie was 12, after she had completed four years of primary school education, the authorities moved her to St. Monica's Home for Coloured Girls, an Anglican boarding-school in Durban. At first, Bessie tried to run away and go home. Later, she began to appreciate the wealth of books and knowledge that the school offered. At the end of her second year, she endured the first great trauma of her life. The authorities abruptly told her that she was the daughter of a white woman, not Nelly Heathcote, and that she would not be allowed to return to her former home for the Christmas holidays. The young teenager was devastated and withdrew into herself.

Two years later, at the end of 1953, Bessie passed her Junior Certificate examination. She went on to do a two-year Teacher Training Certificate at a nearby college, while living at St. Monica's. Finally, at the beginning of 1956, the court declared her an adult; she was awarded a provisional teaching certificate; and she accepted a job as a teacher in a coloured primary school in Durban. During this time she developed close friendships with several of the white staff of St. Monica's, as well as several members of the "Indian" community, and her interest in non-Christian religions flourished, especially Hinduism.

On the other hand, she had only a passing contact with the "black" African majority in Natal, who were overwhelmingly Zulu.

In mid-1958, tired of her daily routines and dreaming of bigger things, Head resigned her job. She had a 21st birthday party with old friends, then took a train for Cape Town, where she intended to become a journalist.

=== Cape Town and Johannesburg ===
South Africa's urbanised non-whites were beginning to stir under the ever-more-restrictive laws of apartheid. Several mass-market newspapers and magazines already catered to their tastes, of which the weekly Drum was the most famous. Head sought employment instead with Drum's sister publication, the weekly Golden City Post. She worked there for almost a year, filing courtroom stories and other small tasks given to rookies in the newsroom. She wrote under her real name, Bessie Amelia Emery.

Although Cape Town was then of a similar size to Durban, it was vastly more diverse and sophisticated, with a much longer history. It was and is the country's political capital, being the home to its Parliament. In Pietermaritzburg and Durban, Bessie had been a member of a small minority group, English-speaking Coloureds (mixed-race). In Cape Town she was suddenly a member of the largest local racial group — Coloured — but one that spoke Afrikaans in its daily life. Although she never became comfortable in this language derived from Cape Town's early Dutch settlers, she was soon able to get by. What she found more difficult to accept were the divisions in this community by skin tone and economic status. She was too dark to join the elite, so she preferred to associate with the workers and underclass in District Six, the large Coloured community that lived on the west side of Table Mountain, not far from the centre. Between her work and her lodgings in District Six, the young provincial newcomer quickly adopted to the style and pace of the big city. She also became more acutely aware of South Africa's many internal conflicts.

In 1959, Head moved to Johannesburg to work on Home Post, another of Drum's sister publications; she was given her own column and a steady salary. Here she met such noted writers as Lewis Nkosi, Can Themba, and Dennis Brutus, and experimented with her own independent writing. But her life-changing experiences at this time were that she came into contact with black nationalist political writings, especially those of the Pan-Africanists George Padmore and Robert Sobukwe. One of Padmore's books "gave me a new skin and a new life that was totally unacceptable to conditions down there," she later wrote. She met Sobukwe and found him an overwhelming personal presence. She also came into contact with jazz and jazz musicians, developing an instant crush on the young Abdullah Ibrahim, then known as Dollar Brand, who led the country's foremost jazz ensemble.

The personal and political exploded in early 1960. Head joined Sobukwe's Pan-Africanist Congress (PAC) a few weeks before that party led a fateful mass protest in Soweto, Sharpeville, and other black townships. The Sharpeville massacre ensued, triggering decisive political and social changes in South Africa. Black political parties were banned and thousands of activists were arrested. Head worked briefly to support PAC prisoners before being arrested herself in an ugly incident of mutual betrayal among PAC sympathisers. Although the charges against her were eventually dismissed, she soon spiralled down into a deep depression and attempted suicide. After a brief hospitalization, she returned to Cape Town, temporarily broken in spirit and disillusioned with politics. Around 1969, Head also began to suffer symptoms of bipolar disorder and schizophrenia.

After a year of lying low, Head reappeared in Cape Town's intellectual and political circles, associating with the multiracial intellectuals of the Liberal Party as well as with the agitators of the PAC. She began to smoke and drink. In July 1961, she met Harold Head, a well-spoken young Coloured man from Pretoria who had many of the same intellectual interests as herself. Six weeks later they were married, and on 15 May 1962 their only child, Howard Rex Head, was born. The infant was marked by a slight (then unrecognised) foetal alcohol disorder, one that was to affect him throughout his life.

Both Harold and Bessie wrote articles at this time, most often for The New African, an upstart monthly published in Cape Town. Bessie also wrote a dramatic novella, The Cardinals, that went unpublished for 30 years. But mostly the Heads were poor and their marriage was deteriorating. Howard proved to be an unsmiling baby. In great frustration Bessie left Cape Town at the end of 1963 to live with her mother-in-law near Pretoria, taking Howard with her. When that relationship also broke down, Head had had enough. She applied for a teaching job in the neighbouring Bechuanaland Protectorate (now Botswana) and was accepted. Although she could not obtain a passport, a friend helped her to obtain a one-way exit permit. Toward the end of March 1964, she and her son boarded a train for the north. Head never saw South Africa again.

=== Botswana ===
In 1964, abandoning her life in South Africa, she moved with her young son to Botswana (then still the Bechuanaland Protectorate) seeking asylum, having been peripherally involved with Pan-African politics. It would take 15 years for Head to obtain Botswana citizenship. Head settled in Serowe, the largest of Botswana's "villages" (i.e., traditional settlements as opposed to settler towns). Serowe was famous both for its historical importance, as capital of the Bamangwato people, and for the experimental Swaneng school of Patrick van Rensburg. The dethroned paramount chief of the Bamangwato, Sir Seretse Khama, was soon to become the first president of independent Botswana.

Her early death in Serowe in 1986 (aged 48) from hepatitis came just at the point where she was starting to achieve recognition as a writer and was no longer so desperately poor.

== Writing ==
Many of Bessie Head's works are set in Serowe, including the novels When Rain Clouds Gather (1968), Maru (1971), and A Question of Power (1973). The three are also autobiographical; When Rain Clouds Gather is based on her experience living on a development farm, Maru incorporates her experience of being considered racially inferior, and A Question of Power draws on her understanding of what it was like to experience acute psychological distress.

Head also published a number of short stories, including the collection The Collector of Treasures (1977). She published a book on the history of Serowe, the village she settled in, called Serowe: Village of the Rainwind. Her last novel, A Bewitched Crossroad (1984), is historical, set in 19th-century Botswana. She had also written a story of two prophets, one wealthy and one who lived poorly called "Jacob: The Faith-Healing Priest". Her work is included in the 1992 anthology Daughters of Africa, edited by Margaret Busby.

Head's work focused on the everyday life of ordinary people and their role in larger African political struggles. Religious ideas often featured prominently, as in the work A Question of Power. Head was initially brought up as a Christian; however, she was later influenced by Hinduism (to which she was exposed through South Africa's Indian community).

Most of her writing took place while she was in exile in Botswana, having left South Africa in 1964. An exception is the novel The Cardinals (published posthumously in 1993), set in South Africa.

In some ways, Head remained an outsider in her adopted country, and some discern she had something of a love-hate relationship with it. She struggled with mental illness and suffered a major psychotic episode in 1969, which led to a period of hospitalisation in Lobatse Mental Hospital. A Question of Power, which Bessie Head considered as "almost autobiographical" was written after this episode.

=== Influences ===
Much of Head's work was influenced by Mahatma Gandhi, and she said she had "never read anything that aroused my feelings like Gandhi’s political statements". Head was strongly inspired by Gandhi and the way he clearly described present political issues. Reading his papers, Head was amazed by the work and came to the conclusion that Gandhi must be "God as a man".

== Honours and awards ==
In 1977, Head attended the University of Iowa's International Writing Program, to which only a select number of writers from all over the world are invited.

In 2003, she was posthumously awarded the South African Order of Ikhamanga in Gold for her "exceptional contribution to literature and the struggle for social change, freedom and peace." The Werda School in Durban, South Africa, which was known as the St. Monica's Diocesan School for Girls when Head attended it, has a memorial wall dedicated to her.

== Legacy ==
In 2007, the Bessie Head Heritage Trust was established, along with the Bessie Head Literature Awards. On 12 July 2007 the main Msunduzi Municipal Library in Pietermaritzburg was renamed the Bessie Head Library in her honour.

The Bessie Head Papers are stored in the Khama III Memorial Museum in Serowe.

== Bibliography ==
- When Rain Clouds Gather – London: Gollancz, 1968. New York: Simon & Schuster, 1969. Heinemann, 1987. Macmillan Education, 2006.
- Maru – London: Gollancz, 1971. New York: McCall, 1971. Heinemann African Writers Series (101), 1972; 1987.
- A Question of Power – London: Davis-Poynter, 1973. New York: Pantheon, 1974. Heinemann (AWS 149), 1974, 1986. Penguin Modern Classics, with an introduction by Margaret Busby, 2002; Penguin African Writers, 2012.
- The Collector of Treasures and Other Botswana Village Tales – London: Heinemann, 1977. Cape Town: David Philip, 1977.
- Serowe: Village of the Rain Wind – London: Heinemann, 1981. Cape Town: David Philip, 1981.
- A Bewitched Crossroad: An African Saga – Johannesburg: Ad Donker, 1984.
- Tales of Tenderness and Power, ed. Gillian Stead Eilersen – Johannesburg: Ad Donker, 1989. Oxford: Heinemann, 1990.
- A Woman Alone: Autobiographical Writings, ed. Craig MacKenzie – Oxford: Heinemann, 1990.
- A Gesture of Belonging: Letters from Bessie Head, 1965–1979, ed. Randolph Vigne – London: South Africa Writers. Portsmouth, New Hampshire: Heinemann, 1990. Johannesburg: Wits University Press, 1991.
- The Cardinals. With Meditations and Short Stories, ed. Margaret J. Daymond – Cape Town: David Philip, 1993. Heinemann, 1996.
- Imaginative Trespasser: Letters between Bessie Head, Patrick and Wendy Cullinan 1963–1977, compiled by Patrick Cullinan, with a personal memoir – Johannesburg: Wits University Press; Trenton, New Jersey: Africa World Press, 2005.
- When Rain Clouds Gather and Maru, introduced by Helen Oyeyemi – London: Virago Press, 2010.
- The Lovers (Heinemann, 2011). Expanded and updated collection of short stories using Tales of Tenderness and Power as a basis.
