= Rhino poaching in Assam =

Rhino poaching in Assam is the illegal act of killing or capturing rhinoceros in pursuit of their horns, in the region of Assam, India. Poaching of rhinos is one of the major environmental issues in India which continues in the region of Kaziranga National Park, Manas National Park, and some other grasslands of Assam. Indian rhinos inhabited most of the floodplain of the Indogangetic and Brahmaputra riverine tracts and the neighboring foothills.

== History ==
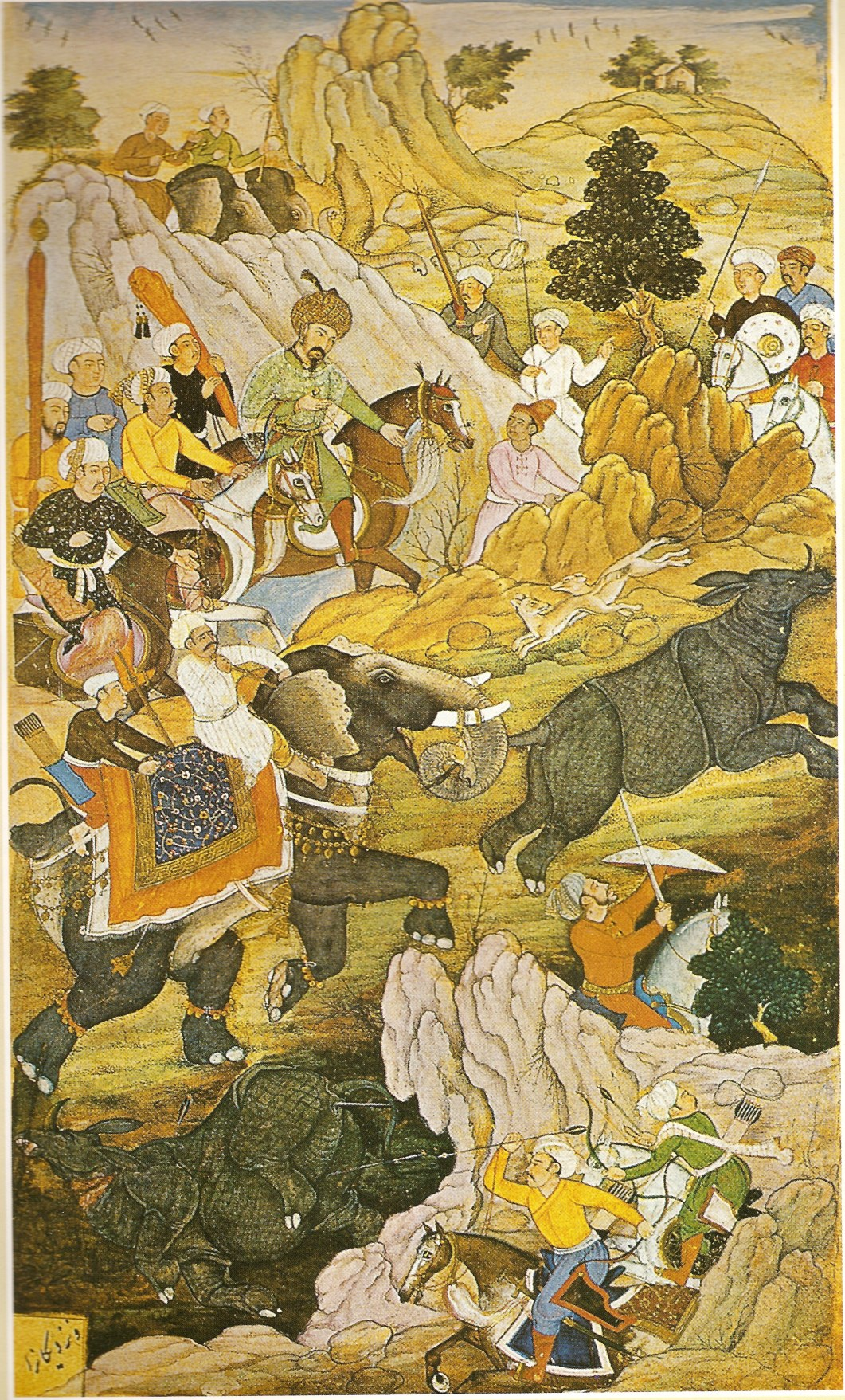
Moghul emperor Babur on a rhino hunt, 16th century

Sport hunting became common in the late 1800s and early 1900s. Indian rhinos were hunted relentlessly and persistently. Reports from the middle of the 19th century claim that some military officers in Assam individually shot more than 200 rhinos. By 1908, the population in Kaziranga had decreased to around 12 individuals. In the early 1900s, the species had declined to near extinction.

Poaching for rhinoceros horn became the single most important reason for the decline of the Indian rhino after conservation measures were put in place from the beginning of the 20th century, when legal hunting ended. From 1980 to 1993, 692 rhinos were poached in India. In India's Laokhowa Wildlife Sanctuary 41 rhinos were killed in 1983, virtually the entire population of the sanctuary. By the mid-1990s, poaching had rendered the species extinct there.

== Methods of poaching ==
Five methods of killing rhinos have been recorded:

- Shooting is by far the most common method used; rhino horn traders hire sharpshooters and often supply them with rifles and swords.
- Trapping in a pit depends largely on the terrain and availability of grass to cover it; pits are dug out in such a way that a fallen animal has little room to manoeuvre with its head slightly above the pit, so that it is easy to saw off the horn.
- Electrocuting is used where high voltage powerlines pass through or near a protected area, to which poachers hook a long insulated rod connected to a wire, which is suspended above a rhino path.
- Poisoning by smearing zinc phosphide rat poison or pesticides on salt licks frequently used by rhinos.
- With a noose, which cuts through the rhino's skin and kills it by strangulation.

== Reasons ==
Illegal rhino horn trade has been the main problem facing managers of the rhino-protected areas of Assam. According to research by Traffic (conservation programme) and World Wide Fund for Nature, some Vietnamese buyers believe horn to be a cure for cancer when ground to a fine powder. According to a survey conducted by World Wide Fund for Nature in South Africa, it is kept by wealthy people in Vietnam as a "peace of mind" cure.

In 1993, rhino horn was removed from the official lists of Traditional Chinese Medicine. It is now only sold in Vietnam following an unsubstantiated rumour that horn cured a high-ranking official in Vietnam of cancer.

== Statistics ==
The following table shows the numbers of poached rhino in Assam since 1962:

Year	Kaziranga	Manas	Orang	Pobitora	Laokhowa	Other areas in Assam	Year-wise Total
1962	1	-	-	-	-	-	1
1963	1	-	-	-	-	-	1
1964	0	-	-	-	-	-	0
1965	18	1	-	-	-	-	19
1966	6	0	-	-	-	-	6
1967	12	0	-	-	-	-	12
1968	9	0	-	-	-	-	9
1969	8	0	-	-	-	-	8
1970	2	0	-	-	-	-	2
1971	8	1	-	-	-	-	9
1972	0	0	-	-	-	-	0
1973	3	0	-	-	-	-	3
1974	3	0	-	-	-	-	3
1975	5	0	-	-	-	-	5
1976	1	4	-	-	-	-	5
1977	0	0	-	-	-	-	0
1978	5	1	-	-	-	-	6
1979	2	5	2	0	6	0	15
1980	11	0	3	0	1	3	18
1981	24	2	2	0	6	4	38
1982	25	1	5	0	5	8	44
1983	37	3	4	0	41	7	92
1984	28	4	3	4	0	6	45
1985	44	1	8	2	0	1	56
1986	45	1	3	0	0	4	52
1987	23	7	4	2	0	7	43
1988	24	1	5	4	1	9	44
1989	44	6	3	3	3	8	64
1990	35	2	0	2	0	6	45
1991	23	3	1	1	0	1	29
1992	49	11	2	3	0	2	67
1993	40	22	1	4	0	3	68
1994	?	?	?	4	?	?	14
1995	?	?	?	2	?	?	27
1996	?	?	?	5	?	?	26
1997	?	?	?	3	?	?	12
1998	8	?	?	4	?	?	12
1999	4	?	?	6	?	?	10
2000	14	?	?	2	?	?	15
2001	9	?	?	?	?	?	10
2002	5	?	?	?	?	?	6
2003	6	?	?	?	?	?	8
2004	5	?	?	?	?	?	5
2005	12	?	?	?	?	?	15
2006	6	?	?	?	?	?	9
2007	?	?	?	?	?	?	20
2008	?	?	?	?	?	?	16
2009	?	?	?	?	?	?	14
2010	?	?	?	?	?	?	18
2011	?	?	?	?	?	?	8
2012	?	?	?	?	?	?	26
2013	?	?	?	?	?	?	28
2014	35	3	?	?	?	?	38
2015	3	?	?	?	?	?	3
2016	19	1	?	?	?	?	20

== Dehorning rhinos ==
The forest department of Assam took a proposal of dehorning rhinoceres to save it from poachers in February 2014. The Government of Assam also called for public opinion by a committee headed by the Principal Chief Conservator of Forest (Wildlife) could take a decision. Many environmentalists and NGO's opposed the proposal. The proposal was unsuccessful.

== See also ==
- Rhino poaching in Southern Africa
