= Prostitution in Botswana =

Prostitution in Botswana is not illegal, but laws such as public disorder, vagrancy, loitering and state recognised religious provisions are used to prosecute prostitutes. Related activities such as soliciting and brothel keeping are illegal. Botswana has made proposals to make prostitution legal to prevent the spread of AIDS. However, there has been mass opposition to it by the Catholic Church. Prostitution is widespread and takes place on the street, bars, hotels, brothels and the cabs of long-distance trucks.

Law enforcement is weak, inconsistent and corrupt. Sex workers report routine violence and extortion by the police. Police sometimes demand sex or bribes from foreign prostitutes under threat of deportation. Condoms are issued free from health centres, but are often confiscated from sex workers by the police.

The Gaborone West shopping complex and the streets surrounding it, are the main area of prostitution in the capital, Gaborone. The Itekeng ward of Francistown (locally known as 'Doublers') is the main area of prostitution in the city. The majority of the prostitutes in both cities are from Zimbabwe. In 2013, the Botswana's Ministry of Health estimated there were more than 1,500 Zimbabwean sex workers in the country, mainly in Gaborone, Francistown and Kasane, out of a total of about 4,000 prostitutes in those three areas.

Although homosexuality is stigmatised in the country, male prostitution is on the increase in Botswana, especially in Gaborone, Palapye, Francistown, Maun, Kasane and Kazungula.

== Legal situation ==
The following items of the Penal Code of Botswana criminalises, or is used to criminalise, prostitution and related activities:

- 90. Offensive conduct conducive to breaches of the peace
- 136. Insult to religion of any class
- 149. Procuration
- 150. Procuring defilement of person by threats or fraud or administering drugs
- 153. Detention of persons for immoral purposes
- 155. Person living on earnings of prostitution or persistently soliciting
- 156. Person aiding, etc. for gain, prostitution
- 157. Premises used for prostitution
- 158. Brothels
- 176. Common nuisance
- 179. Idle and disorderly persons
- 182. Rogues and vagabonds
- 184. Spreading infection

Section 57 of the 2009 Children's Act makes it a crime to induce, coerce or encourage a child to engage in prostitution, subject to two to five years imprisonment and/or a fine of 50,000 pula ($4,685).

The 2014 Anti-Human Trafficking Act criminalises all forms of trafficking, essentially tracking international law and making it a crime to use force, fraud or coercion for the purpose of exploitation.

Feminist activists including Resego Kgosidintsi have pushed for the legalization of sex work in Botswana as a method of decreasing secrecy and violence against women.

== HIV ==
Botswana is experiencing one of the most severe HIV/AIDS epidemics in the world. The national HIV prevalence rate among adults ages 15 to 49 is 24.8 percent, which is the third highest in the world, behind Lesotho and Eswatini. Sex workers are a high risk group. In 2012 it was reported sex workers have an HIV prevalence of 61.9%.

Sex workers report that many clients are reluctant to use condoms. Some will pay more for unprotected sex, others use violence.

== Sex trafficking ==
Botswana is a source, transit, and destination country for women and children subjected to sex trafficking. Residents of Botswana most vulnerable to trafficking are unemployed women, the rural poor, agricultural workers, and children. Botswana girls and women are possibly exploited in prostitution within the country, including in bars and by truck drivers along major highways. Some women may be subjected to trafficking internally or transported from neighbouring countries and subjected to sexual exploitation. Undocumented migrant Zimbabwean children might be vulnerable to trafficking in Botswana. There has been no comprehensive international or domestic study of trafficking trends within the country.

The United States Department of State Office to Monitor and Combat Trafficking in Persons ranks Botswana as a Tier 2 country.

== Sources ==
- Nnabugwu-Otesanya, Bernadette (2005). "6" (PDF). A Comparative Study of Prostitutes in Nigeria and Botswana (Thesis). University of South Africa.
