= Providence Oatlhotse =

Botswana chess player (born 1985)

Personal information
- Born: December 18, 1985 (age 40) Serowe, Botswana

Chess career
- Country: Botswana
- Title: International Master (2012)
- Peak rating: 2326 (April 2019)

Providence Oatlhotse is a Botswana chess player. He is the highest-rated player of his country.

== Chess career ==
Oatlhotse has won the Botswana Chess Championship several times; in 2004, 2008, 2009, 2012, 2015, 2018, 2024, 2025 and 2026.

In 2012, Oatlhotse got his IM title after winning the African Individual Chess Championships.

In July 2015, Oatlhotse won the Millionaire Chess Satellite tournament ahead of Chitumbo Mwali and Johannes Mabusela. In July 2019, he won the 2019 Gaborone International Open Chess Championship.

Oatlhotse won the right to play in the Chess World Cup 2023 by defeating Gomolemo Rongwane in the qualifiers event. At the 2023 World Cup, he was defeated by S. L. Narayanan in the first round.
