= Paje, Botswana =

Village in Botswana

Coordinates: 22°16′20″S 26°47′24″E

Location of Paje

Paje is a village in Central District of Botswana. It is located 20 km north-east of Serowe, and the population was 2,088 in 2001 census.
