= Botswana Chess Federation =

- Sport: Chess
- Jurisdiction: national
- Affiliation: FIDE

The Botswana Chess Federation is the organization that aims to promote the practice of chess in Botswana. It organizes the Botswana Chess Championship.

The Botswana Chess Federation has been affiliated with the International Chess Federation since 1982.
