= Khama III Memorial Museum =

- Established: October 19, 1985; 40 years ago
- Location: Serowe, Botswana
- Coordinates: 22.382132°S 26.708068°E
- Type: History museum

The Khama III Memorial Museum is a museum located in Serowe, Botswana. The museum is dedicated to the history of the Khama family and Serowe.

== History ==
In 1985, the museum was opened for the first time. Lenyetse Seretse donated a house for the museum, which had been built around 1910. The intention with creating this museum was to promote cultural pride in Serowe. The museum has produced an occasional journal called Lekgapho, which is distributed widely around Botswana.

== Collections and exhibitions ==
Among the museum's exhibits include correspondence, uniforms and furniture, in addition to exhibits on snakes and animals native to Africa. The museum contains musical instruments from the eastern Kalahari and ethnographic artifacts from Bangwato merafe, which date back to the time of Khaima III. The museum also has artifacts about the culture of the San people and the museum contains temporary art displays. In addition, the museum has also preserved historical Botswana uniforms.

The museum contains photographs of the funeral of Botswana's first president, Seretse Khama, and archives about the Khama family.

After writer Bessie Head's death, the museum acquired several of her papers, including notes and sketches as well as writings. In 2006, Bessie Head's room was installed in the museum, as well as permanent exhibits about the writer. In July 2013, the Bessie Head Society in collaboration with the museum organized a symposium in Serowe to commemorate the anniversary of the publication of Bessie's book, A Question of Power.

In November 2020, the museum opened 'Then we were Bechuana', a display of late 19th-century items, curated by Scobie Lekhutile and Gase Kediseng. The display featured digitised images of items in Brighton Museum. The real items were intended to have been displayed through an international loan but this had not been possible because of the COVID-19 pandemic.

In 2026, Brighton and Hove Museums announced the repatriation of 45 objects to the Khama III Memorial Museum. The items from the Gammangwato region had been acquired by a missionary who had worked with Khama III and were lent to Brighton Museum in 1899 before being donated in 1936. The James Henry Green Charitable Trust supported the repatriation and the development of a permanent exhibition in which to display the items, to open in May 2026. A cultural festival was planned to celebrate the repatriation and Botswana's creativity and history.

== International connections ==
In 2014, the U.S. government donated $78000 (1 074 028,02 pula) to preserve the museum's artifacts which include Khama family manuscripts and Bessie's literary works. The Norwegian Agency for Development Cooperation and Danish Volunteer Service have also financially supported the museum.

The British High Commissioner to Botswana, Katy Ransome, visited some of Serowe's historical sites in August 2016, including the museum. In October 2018, Cuba's ambassador to Botswana, Patricia L. Pego Guerra, visited the museum.
