= Serowe Airport =

- An oblique aerial view of the Serowe Village in the foreground and airstrip in the background, c1920s.
- IATA: none; ICAO: FBSR

Summary
- Serves: Serowe, Botswana
- Elevation AMSL: 1,158 m (3,799 ft)
- Coordinates: 22°25′24″S 026°45′24″E

Map
- Location of airport in Botswana

Runways
Direction	Length		Surface
Direction	m	ft	Surface
Closed
- Source: Great Circle Mapper

Serowe Airport (ICAO: FBSR) was an airport serving the town of Serowe, Botswana. The airport is closed.

Serowe Airport was established in 1920.
