= Bessie Head Library =

Library in Pietermaritzburg, South Africa

Coordinates: 29°36′03″S 30°22′50″E

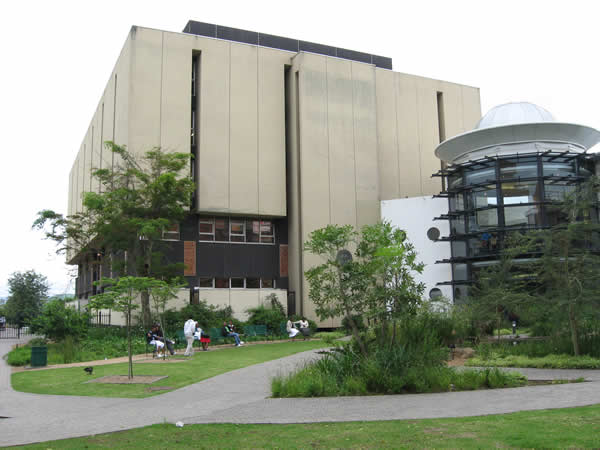

The Bessie Head Library (before 2005 also known as Msunduzi Municipal Library, and before that as the Natal Society Library) in Pietermaritzburg, Msunduzi Local Municipality, is the oldest library in KwaZulu-Natal, South Africa. It was established in 1849 and became a legal deposit library in 1916. It is named after the writer Bessie Head.

== History ==
In 1846 the Book Society of Pietermaritzburg was established, supported by David Dale Buchanan, editor of the Natal Witness. It had a reading room and a small library and opened as Pietermaritzburg's first public library in 1849. It initially struggled, but was later supported by the Natal Society (launched in 1851) which, by 1865, had absorbed the Book Society and started to raise funds for a permanent location. For 2,000 guineas, the Society bought 20 Longmarket Street in 1876; it opened as a public library and museum in February 1878.

In 1916, the Natal Society Library was granted legal deposit status. With every book published in South Africa now held in the library for copyright and archival purposes, it had to be repeatedly expanded. New Longmarket Street buildings were added in 1929 and 1957, and a building in Commercial Road was leased from 1963.

In 1967, after the municipality agreed to finance the library, it became a free lending library. During the apartheid years, the library remained open to all residents, irrespective of race, and expanded with 11 branches across the city.

The Longmarket Street library buildings were eventually replaced in 1975 by a new modern library built in Church Street, which opened on 17 June 1975. This remained the city's main library building for more than 30 years. In 2004, the Natal Society transferred the library and its staff to the Msunduzi Local Municipality. Soon after, a new building funded by the city, with furnishings and stock funded by the Carnegie Corporation, was officially opened on 12 July 2007 and named after Bessie Head, a South African writer and anti-apartheid activist born in Pietermaritzburg.

Today the library is one of South Africa's five legal deposit libraries. It is the only KwaZulu-Natal institution holding all books written by the Indian political activist Mahatma Gandhi.
