= Serowe =

Serowe Mma Ngwato
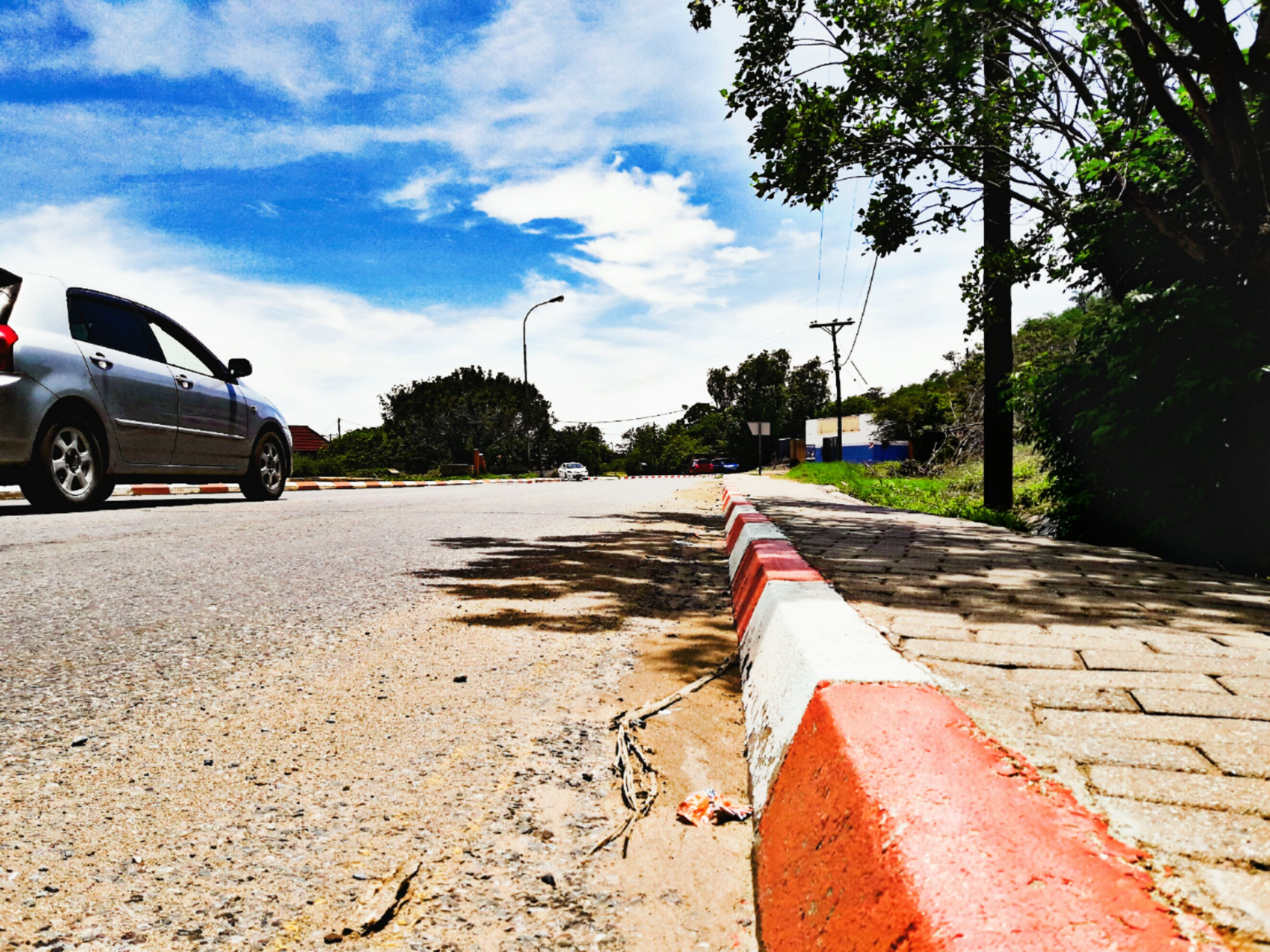
- Street in Serowe
- Nickname: Sjapi
- Location of Serowe in Botswana
- Coordinates: 22°23′S 26°43′E
- Country: Botswana
- District: Serowe District
- District: Serowe District
- Elevation: 1,140 m (3,740 ft)

Population (2011)
  - Total: 47,447
- Time zone: UTC+2 (Central Africa Time)
  - Summer (DST): UTC+2 (not observed)
- Area code: 463xxxx
- ISO 3166 code: BW=CE
- Climate: BSh
- Website: http://serowe.cdc.gov.bw/

Serowe is an urban village in Botswana's Central District. A trade and commercial centre, it is Botswana's third largest village. Serowe has played an important role in Botswana's history, as capital for the Bamangwato people in the early 20th century and as birthplace of several of Botswana's presidents. More recently it has undergone significant development as the town and as Botswana continues to grow.

== History ==
Serowe has a memorial to Khama III, chief of the Bamangwato people in the late 19th-early 20th century, who in 1902 founded the town as a new capital of the Bamangwato. They called the area Serowa after the bulb plant they found in the area, which was indicative of water. However, the name Serowe stuck because British settlers misspelt it, and the people agreed to keep it. The word Serowe does not exist in Setswana. It is also the birthplace of Seretse Khama, Botswana's first president, and the traditional center of the Bamangwato tribe.

Swaneng Hill School was the first of the Brigades Movement schools founded by educationalist Patrick van Rensburg.

== Geography ==
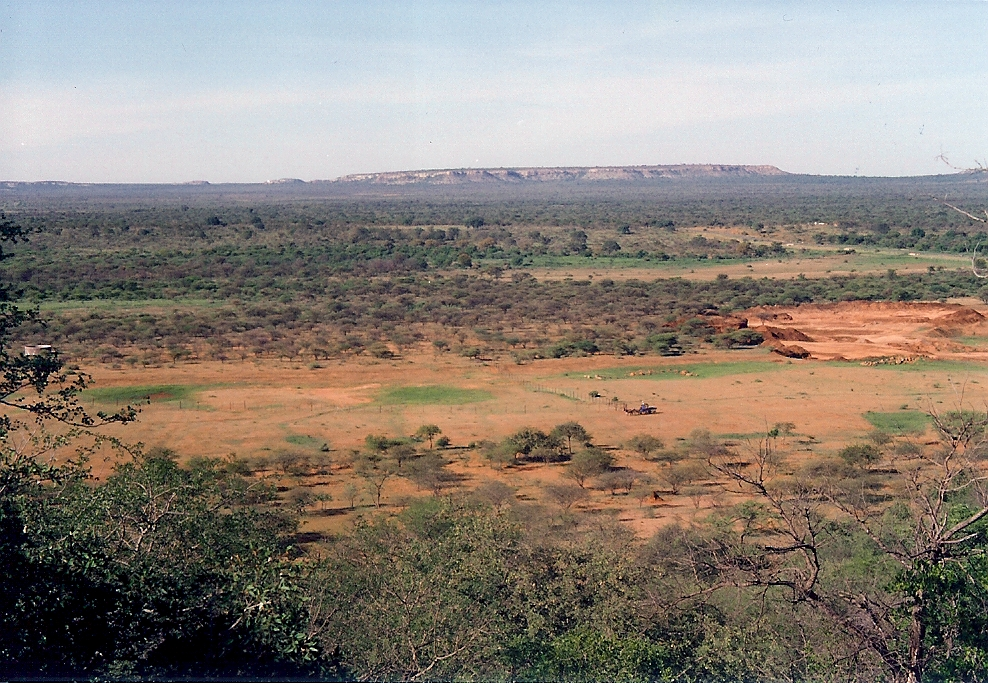
View from Swaneng Hill east across the Kalahari

Serowe is located in a fertile area, well-watered by the Lotsane River. It lies west of the Gaborone–Francistown road, from which it is easily reached. It also marks the beginning of the Serowe-Orapa road, which ends at the diamond mines of Orapa. Construction of this road began in 1986 and was completed several years later.

There are two hills at Swaneng, called Rra-Swaneng and Mma-Swaneng – Father- and Mother-Swaneng – respectively.

Notable features of the local area include a Botswana Defence Force (BDF) base at Paje and the Khama Rhino Sanctuary on the road to Orapa. The Rhino Sanctuary is a charitable game reserve, 25 km north of Serowe, established in 1992 by the local Ballentine and Watson families and Ian Khama (the former president). Its 4,300 hectares of Kalahari sandveld were established as a haven for black and white rhinoceroses.

== Government ==
Serowe currently serves as capital of the Serowe District. The first president Sir Seretse Khama (father of the fourth President President Lieutenant General Ian Khama) and the third president Festus Mogae of Botswana were born in Serowe.

The Botswana Prison Service (BPS) operates the Serowe New Prison.

== Infrastructure ==
Since 2000, Serowe has undergone numerous developments and continues to expand at a steady rate, despite exponential growth from neighbouring Palapye. The Swaneng Senior Secondary School, fondly referred to as Swaneng Hill, has been upgraded by the Botswana government through contract with a Chinese construction company. It now has relatively modern chemistry, physics and biology laboratories, although they lack equipment for in-depth experiments. As a result, student interest in the sciences has grown, with a number of students going overseas to continue their studies. The school's history department regularly takes students on field trips to ancient sites around the country. Debating is highly encouraged, and has led to a number of national championship titles.

A major recent upgrade involved the construction of the new state-of-the-art Sekgoma Hospital, which is located 6 km to the south of the main town, replacing the old and derelict hospital of the same name. It now operates as the main medical centre in the district. The hospital was constructed at an estimated cost of P300 million and was opened to the public in late 2007, reducing a heavy burden at the Francistown Hospital, which was subject to overcrowding and unhygienic conditions. Adjacent to Sekgoma Memorial is the Institute of Health Sciences (IHS) Serowe Campus which provides training to health workers in various areas such as general nursing and health education. The Serowe IHS campus is one of the 6 campuses found at different major hospitals in Botswana.

The Old Sekgoma Memorial Hospital has been refurbished and turned into a 24hr clinic that has sexual health and reproductive services Centre, chronic disease center, TB Clinic and District Drug hub.

Another major recent development is the Serowe Stadium and surrounding sports complex. This project, which cost the Botswana government P30 million, was opened in mid-2003. It currently provides the Central District with its only major sports facility.

The town used to be served by Serowe Airport. The airport location was used to build the now completed Sekgoma Memorial Hospital and the adjacent Nursing Institute.

== Literature ==
Serowe was the adopted hometown of South African-born writer Bessie Head, inspiring her 1974 book Serowe: Village of the Rain Wind. Her importance to the village is remembered in the Bessie Head Room of the Khama III Memorial Museum, established in 2007.

== Notable people ==
- Festus Mogae, politician and President
- Marang Molosiwa, actress, comes from this area.
- Resego Kgosidintsi, feminist activist, was born in this area
- Providence Oatlhotse, national chess champion
