= When Rain Clouds Gather =

1968 debut novel by Bessie Head

- First edition cover
- Author: Bessie Head
- Language: English
- Genre: Novel
- Set in: Eastern Botswana, 1960s
- Publisher: Victor Gollancz
- Publication date: 1968; 58 years ago
- Publication place: United Kingdom
- Media type: Print: hardback octavo
- Pages: 188
- ISBN: 0435909614
- OCLC: 251800534
- Dewey Decimal: 823.914
- LC Class: PR9408.B553H4
- Followed by: Maru

When Rain Clouds Gather is the first novel by South African-Motswana author Bessie Head, published in 1968.

Having left South Africa in 1964, Head wrote the novel while in exile in Botswana, completing it in 1967. It was first published in London by Victor Gollancz and subsequently by William Heinemann (1972), and in the US by Simon & Schuster.

== Premise ==
Makhaya escapes Apartheid South Africa into Botswana. In the village of Golema Mmidi he meets Gilbert, an Englishman who is trying to modernise farming. They join forces to create a utopia but are opposed by the village chief.

== Reception ==
David P. Bargueño wrote that the book emphasises the twin aspects of hope and despair, and that it depicts love as "a magical force that can overcome insuperable challenges", an idea not present in Head's 1973 work A Question of Power, written after her nervous breakdown.

Helen Oyeyemi wrote of When Rain Clouds Gather and Head that "Her men […] are intensely perceptive, imbued with a 'feminine sensitivity' that raises them above the level of 'grovelling sex organs' that Head complained African men were traditionally reduced to within their communities."

Writing in Open Cultural Studies in 2019, Gerd Bayer says that When Rain Clouds Gather "anticipated some of the politics of early twenty-first-century environmental thinking in the postcolonial sphere. The alliance of various marginalized characters who, one way or another, violate against existing hegemonic structures replaces the ideological and cultural conflict over territory."

In 2022, When Rain Clouds Gather was included on the Big Jubilee Read, a list of 70 books by Commonwealth authors produced to celebrate Queen Elizabeth II's Platinum Jubilee.

The novel is referenced in the project When Rain Clouds Gather: Black South African Women Artists, 1940–2000, curated by Portia Malatjie and Nontobeko Ntombela.
