= Rhinoceros poaching in Southern Africa =

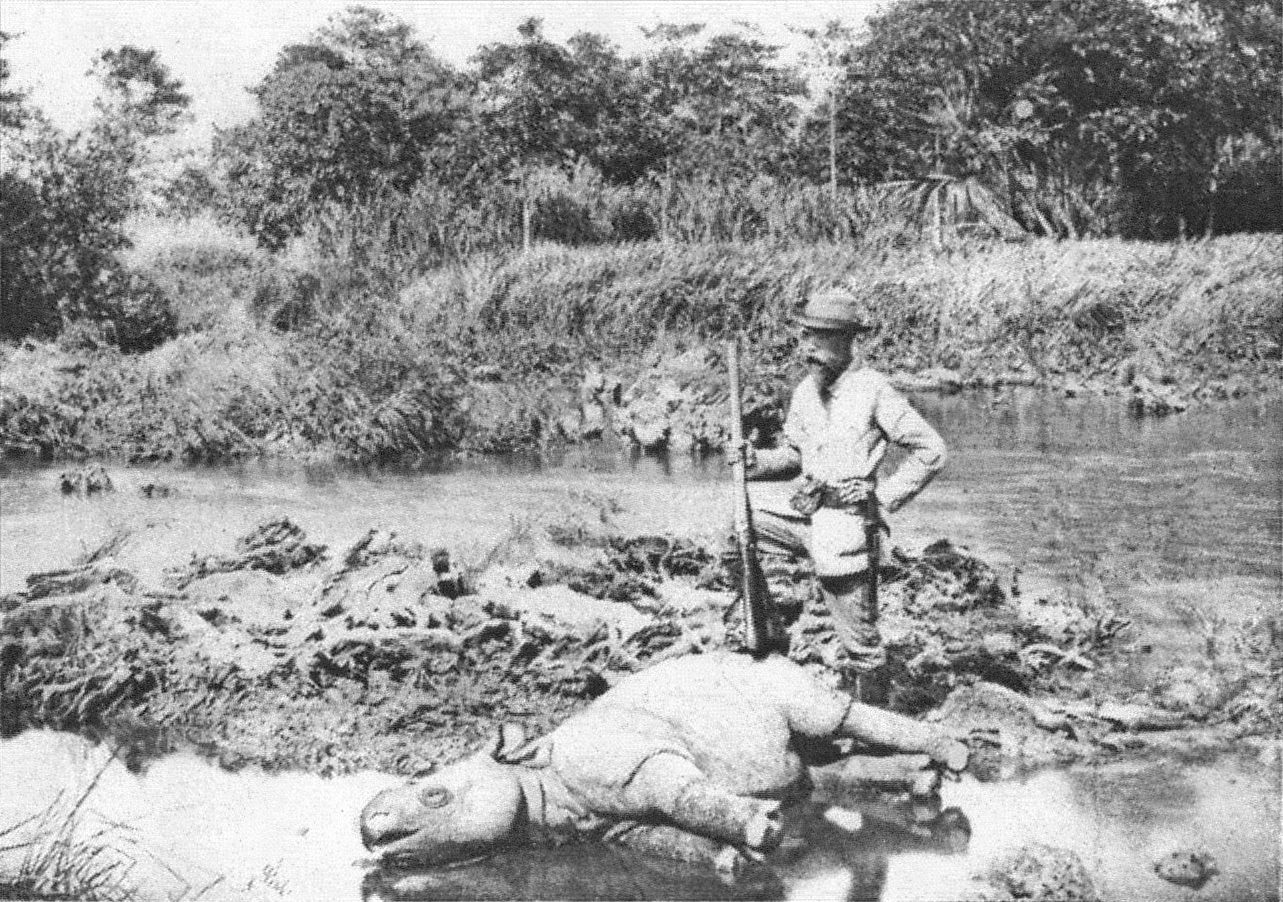
A hunter pictured standing over a rhino in the colonial era

Rhinoceros poaching in southern Africa is the illegal act of killing or capturing rhinoceros in pursuit of their horns, in the southern African countries of Namibia, Botswana, Zimbabwe and South Africa, where most of Africa's rhinos live. The most common reason for rhino poaching is to meet the high demand for their horns in Asian countries, where the horn is predominantly used in traditional Chinese medicine but is increasingly being used as a symbol of wealth and prosperity. In previous generations, the most common rhino poaching activity was hunting for recreational purposes. Because of excessive poaching, rhino populations have decline rapidly since the 1970s, leaving some species critically endangered and facing extinction.

Rhino poaching is illegal and there are several organisations in place to save the rhinos and prevent poachers and traffickers. International rhino horn trade is illegal; however, a lucrative black market exists stemming from the rising demand from South East Asian countries, particularly Vietnam and China. Rhino horn is estimated to be valued at $60,000 per 1 pound (0.45 kg) on the black market, a value approximately three times that of gold.

== History ==
The history of rhino poaching in southern Africa dates to the colonial era when the British went ashore at the current Cape Town in 1647. Since then, rhino populations have fluctuated and there have been multiple periods when different species of rhino have threatened extinction.

During the colonial era in southern Africa, rhinos were hunted recreationally as a sport and for the possession of their horns, which were used as symbol of wealth and prosperity. This led to a gradual but constant decline in rhino populations across southern Africa during the colonial era.

In the early 20th century, the white rhino population in South Africa was down to 10, and in 1933 the black rhino population was recorded at 110. The white rhino population made a recovery due to the intervention of the Africa's oldest nature reserve; the Hluhluwe-Mfolozi Park in KwaZulu-Natal. The sanctuary assisted with the breeding and conservation of the white rhino population. The black rhino population was also able to recover.

In the 1950s to the 1960s, the Hluhluwe-iMfolozi Park and Wilderness Foundation founder Ian Player were the initiators of rhino preservation and conservation in South Africa and were able to breed white rhinos and bring the species back from extinction in an initiative known as “Operation Rhino”. The population of black rhino recovered to 100,000 by 1960.

During the 1970s to the 1980s, poaching of black rhino increased dramatically due to the growing demand for rhino horn in South East Asian countries, where the rhino horn is deemed to be an important ingredient in traditional Chinese medicine. Between 1970 and 1992, 96% of the black rhino population was eliminated, with the predominant cause of rhino death due to poaching.

By 2010, there were over 20,000 white rhinos in South Africa, which made up 90% of the rhino population in Africa. The rhino population continued to grow despite the presence of poachers, which was maintained at a consistently low level during this period.

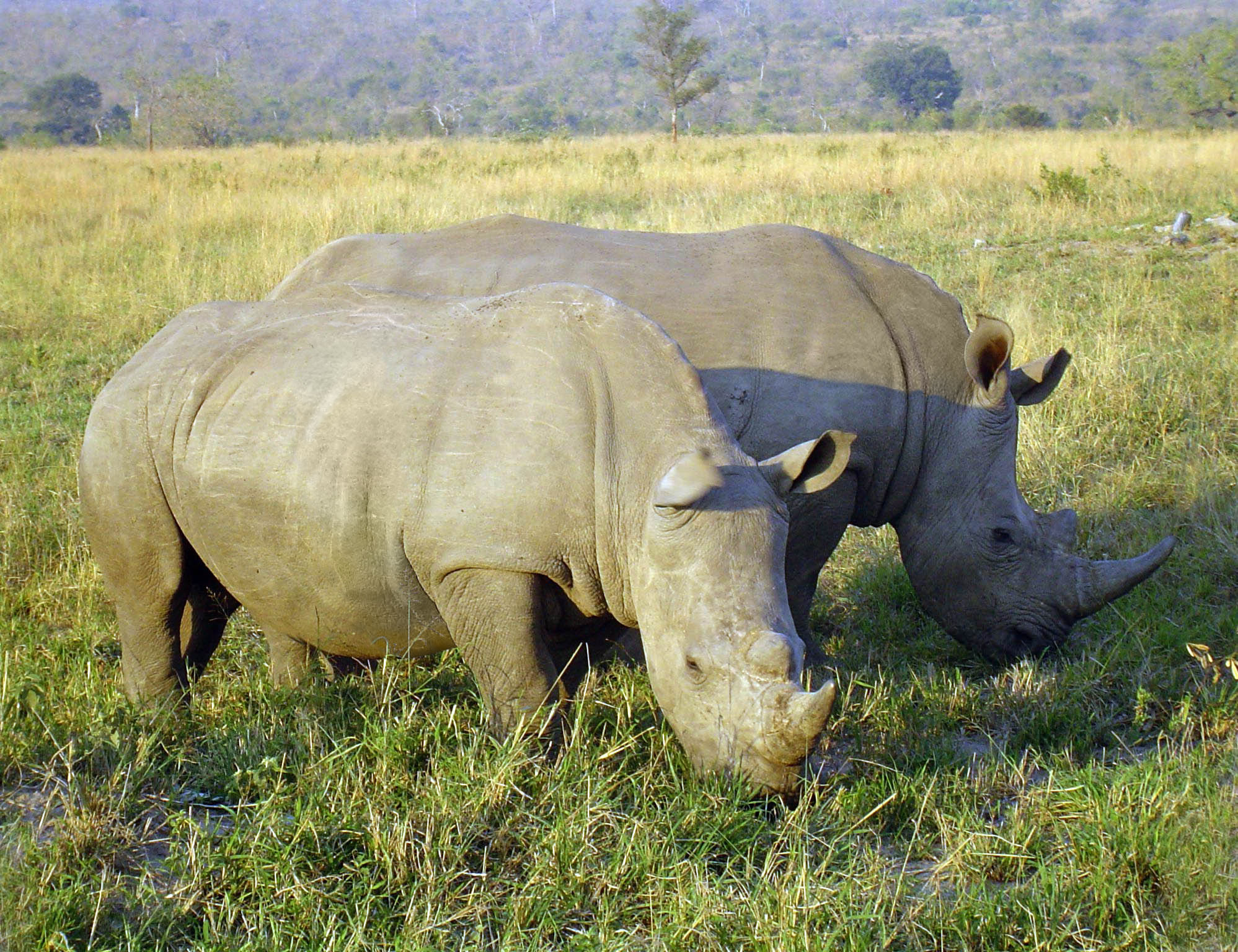
Two white rhinos pictured grazing in the Kruger National Park, South Africa

From 2008 to 2015, the demand for rhino horn out of South East Asian countries increased dramatically and was the source of the 90-fold increase in rhino poaching incidents in southern Africa. During this period, poaching statistics continued to grow and in 2014 rhino poaching was at its highest, with an estimated 1,215 rhinos poached in South Africa alone.

Between 2015 and 2019, annual poaching figures in South Africa have fallen. The current black rhino and white rhino population is estimated to be around 5,000 and 18,000 respectively. 90% of the remaining black and white rhinos are in the southern African countries of Namibia, Botswana and South Africa.

South African Environment Minister Barbara Creecy reported on 1 February 2021 that rhinoceros poaching in that country was down for the sixth year in a row, to 394 animals killed in 2020 for their horns. She attributed the decline to both the COVID-19 pandemic and to work by rangers and security personnel and noted that it was still a major problem.

== Reasons for poaching ==
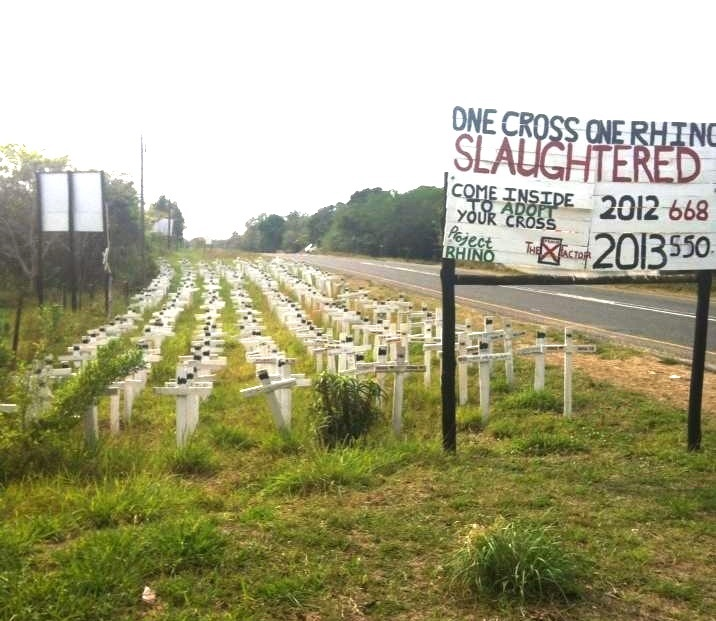
Memorial to rhinos killed by poachers near St Lucia Estuary, South Africa

During the colonial era, the leading cause of rhino deaths was attributed to uncontrolled hunting. Rhino hunting was considered a recreational activity and the horn was kept by the hunter as a trophy. In more recent times, rhino horns are increasingly being used for decorative purposes and as a symbol of wealth.

Rhino horn is used as an ingredient in certain traditional Chinese medicine practices. The surge in poaching during the 1970s and 1980s was caused by the increased demand coming from South-East Asian countries. Rhino horn was removed from the official list of traditional Chinese medicine in the Chinese Medicine Pharmacopeia in 1993, as there are no measurable health benefits and no scientific evidence supporting its use. In 2018, China reversed the ban on trade on rhino horn. Despite this lack of evidence, many users of traditional Chinese medicine still believe rhino horn has medicinal benefits and use it to treat a wide variety of illnesses such as headaches, fevers, convulsions and in some cases cancer. The horn is crushed into a fine powder and manufactured into tablets or dissolved in boiling water and consumed orally.

Rhino horn is a commodity valued at 3 times that of gold. Statistics suggest that the future of the rhino population is uncertain, consequently increasing the value of the rhino horn as a commodity. As a result, in recent times rhino horns are being stockpiled by investors that believe they will appreciate due to their scarcity.

== Methods of poaching ==
Poachers are often hired by the sellers and traffickers of rhino horns. A variety of methods have been used by the poachers to incapacitate rhinos over the years. Once the rhino is incapacitated, the poachers usually cut off the base plate of the rhino's horn with either a machete or a chainsaw in a process called “de-horning”.

The most common method of killing rhinos is shooting them with a rifle or shotgun. Trained gunmen are hired to carry out the poaching missions utilising advanced combat technologies such as silenced weapons and night vision scopes. Shooting is the safest method for the poacher as they can maintain a safe distance from the rhino.

Another common method of incapacitating rhinos is to tranquilize them. Tranquilizer darts have the advantage of being less noisy than bullets. Since tranquilizer darts require specialized training, rhinos may die from overdose when being tranquilized by poachers. If the rhino survives, it will bleed to death after the horn is removed.

Poachers lure the rhino towards a pit they have constructed in attempt to capture and secure the rhino. Trapping rhinos in a pit is often used in conjunction with other poaching techniques such as shooting.

In certain areas where high-powered power lines are present, poachers lure the rhino towards the power line, where they use modified equipment to utilise the high-voltage current to electrocute the rhino.

Poachers smear rat poison on salt and mineral deposits, which rhinos often lick to revitalise certain parts of their digestive system. The poison is lethal once ingested by the rhino.

== Poaching statistics ==
=== In South Africa ===
As of 2020, 80% of the world's remaining rhinos are found in South Africa, which has become the epicentre of rhino poaching. A surge in rhino poaching was observed in 2008 and again in 2012. The number of rhino deaths due to poaching then increased sharply to a record high of 1,215 in 2014. At this point it was decided to translocate more than a hundred (exact numbers unknown) tagged and micro-chipped rhinos to Botswana's remote wilderness, where at the time, they were safer. Some were relocated to the Khama Rhino Sanctuary and some to the Okavango on private concessions, where they received protection from rangers and the BDF.

The total number of rhino deaths have since fallen. In 2018, 769 rhinos were poached in South Africa, and in 2019, 594. Sentences of 24 to 25 years in prison have been handed out to convicted poachers in 2019 and 2020. Mitigating measures implemented by 2020 include improved situational awareness and reaction times, deployment of technology and improved information collection and sharing among law enforcement departments. National en regional cooperation was enhanced while participation of the private sector, non-governmental organisations and donors is encouraged. The table below shows the number of rhinos poached in the various provinces of South Africa as well as the rhino deaths due to poaching in the whole of the African continent from 2007 to 2018.

Table 1. Number of rhinos poached in Africa and the Republic of South Africa
Year	Region	
Year	Africa	South Africa
2007	62	13
2008	262	83
2009	201	122
2010	426	333
2011	532	448
2012	751	668
2013	1,123	1,004
2014	1,324	1,215
2015	1,349	1,175
2016	1,167	1,054
2017	1,124	1,028
2018		769
2019		594
2020		394

Table 2. Number of Rhinos poached in South African National Parks and Provinces
South African Provinces & National Parks	Year	
South African Provinces & National Parks	2017	2018
Kruger National Park	504	421
Marakele National Park	-	1
Gauteng	4	2
Limpopo	79	40
Mpumalanga	49	51
North West Province	96	65
Eastern Cape	12	19
Free State	38	16
Northern Cape	24	12
Kwa-Zulu Natal	222	142
Western Cape	-	-
Total	1,028	769

=== In Botswana ===
From October 2018 to December 2019 thirty-one rhinos (23 white and 8 black) were killed in safari areas in the Okavango Delta, mainly in areas protected by anti-poaching units and armed members of the Botswana Defence Force (BDF). In March 2020 the BDF killed one poacher in the Shaile/Linyanti area, and in April 2020 four others were killed in the Linyanti area. After a sixth poacher was killed, the Botswana government announced that the situation was brought under control.

== Rhino horn trafficking and the black-market trade ==
After the rhino poachers have obtained the rhino horns, they sell the horns to traffickers. Traffickers act as the intermediaries between the poachers and the end users, with most of the demand coming from consumer markets in China and Vietnam. In recent years, the demand for rhino horn has increased due to the growing purchasing power of the Asian middle class as well as the rising scarcity of rhino horn. The trafficking enterprises are sophisticated global organisations supported by the lucrative industry. Since 1977, the international trade of rhino horn has been declared illegal by the Convention on International Trade of Endangered Species (CITES) in response to the concern that increased demand is fuelling the number of rhino deaths due to poaching. The international trade ban of rhino horn has created a lucrative black-market estimated at $20 billion a year. Rhino horn is valued at $60,000 per kilogram on the black market – more than its weight in gold.

== Conservation tactics ==
=== De-horning ===
Understanding the viability and impacts of de-horning has been a subject of study since the early 1990's. Of relevance - the following instrumental studies are noted, Lindeque (1990) wrote of the case for dehorning black rhino in Namibia. t'Sas-Rolfes (1993) contended that the nature of the demand for rhino horn is price-inelastic in the higher price range of the market. This argument would remain central in future debates by stakeholders on legalizing trade. Milner-Gulland et al. (1992) represents the first rigorous attempt to model the viability of dehorning - and quickly identifies several key parameters (e.g. mortality by anaesthetic, rate of regrowth). The authors presciently predict in 1992 that the medical technology will improve - and mortality induced by the anaesthetic would decrease - and it has, to the point where it is no longer regarded as an input to the models (Kuiper et al. 2025). Loon and Polakow (1997) expanded the Milner-Gulland et al. 1992 work to decouple the cost of dehorning and maintenance with the price of horn - and which was expected to demonstrate extreme volatility (and possibly astronomical appreciation) as the illicit trade continued.

In 2019, in an attempt to prevent the poaching of rhinos, some rhinos in South Africa have been tranquilized and had their horns removed in a process carried out by local national park authorities and private sanctuaries. Hard questions were being asked at the time. Rhinos were being killed at alarming rates, while hundreds of millions of rands were being spent on interventions – dehorning among them – without clear evidence of success. Dehorning itself had met with a lot of criticism regarding its efficacy, cost and behavioural implications to the animals. Stakeholders wanted to know whether this would be a study worth funding, including one commencing in 2020.

A landmark study was launched then in combination with the Greater Kruger Environmental Protection Foundation and South African National Parks, supported by local and international academics, and by the management of all nature reserves comprising the Greater Kruger National Park and South African National Park representatives. The results of this study were released in a public report to the donors and industry in 2024. The same work was then published in a 2025 landdmark paper in the prestigious Journal Science - and analyzed poaching data from 11 reserves in South Africa's Greater Kruger ecosystem between 2017 and 2023, during which 1,985 rhinos were poached despite approximately USD 74 million spent on anti-poaching measures. The study found that traditional law enforcement efforts, such as rangers, tracking dogs, and surveillance, did not significantly reduce poaching rates. In contrast, dehorning led to an average 75–78% decrease in poaching across reserves that implemented the practice. Dehorning proved to be the most cost-effective intervention, accounting for only 1.2% of total anti-poaching spending. However, some poaching of dehorned rhinos continued, primarily due to horn regrowth and targeting of horn stumps. The authors have publicly noted that the study’s outcome supports the case for dehorning as an effective short- to medium term deterrent against poaching, but it is not a silver bullet. It should rather be seen as one tool in a broader arsenal. Lasting solutions must include dismantling criminal syndicates, investing in local communities, and materially improving support for the field rangers on whom so much depends.

=== Pink dye ===
The Rhino Rescue Project in the South African city of Krugersdorp implemented a technique whereby they infuse the rhino horn with a pink dye that is toxic to humans. This procedure takes place while the rhino is sedated and causes no harm to the rhino or other animals in the national parks. Since the dye is toxic to humans, the horn is no longer of use in traditional Chinese medicine and as a result diminishes in trade value.

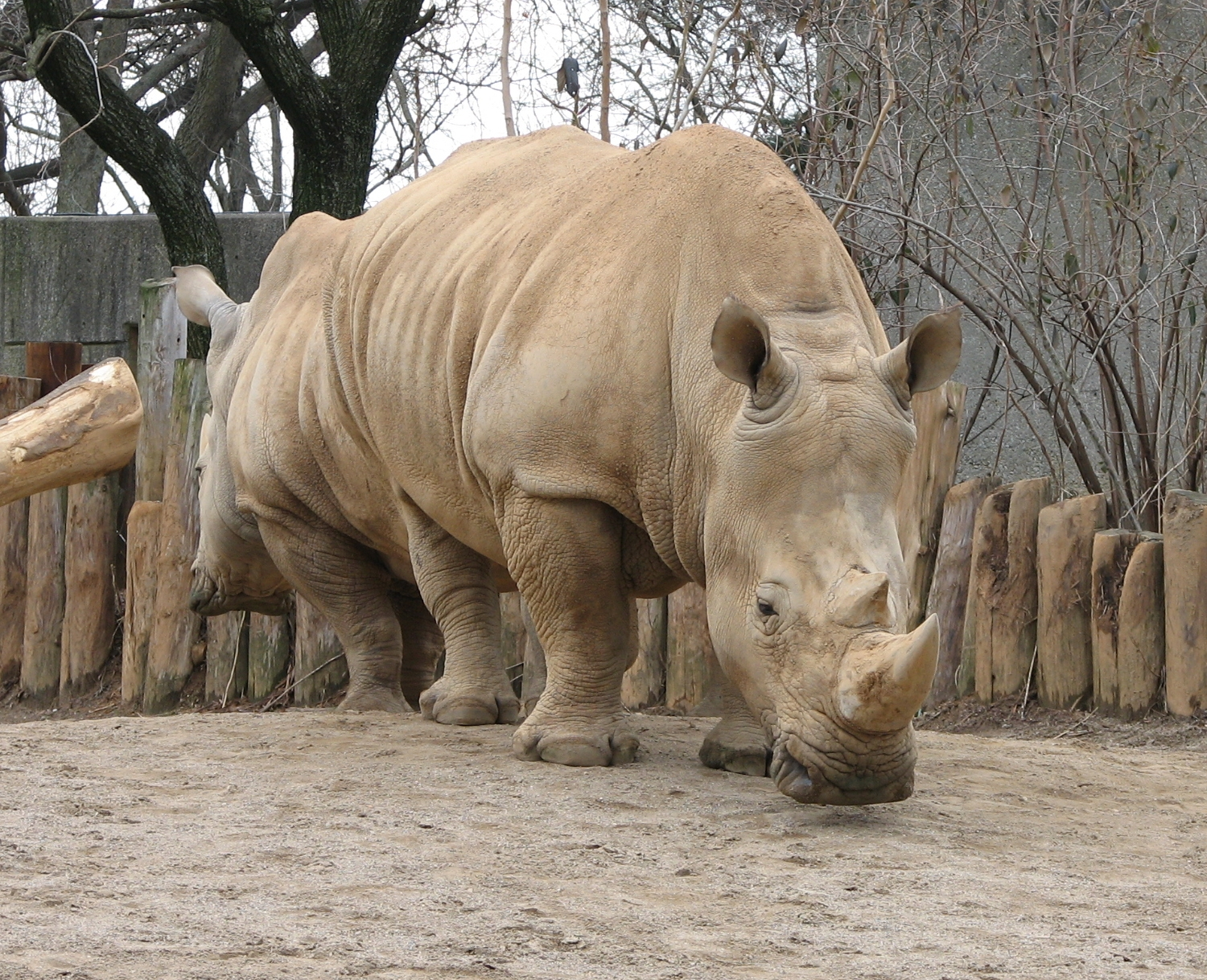
Two White Rhinos living in captivity

=== Security units ===
Armed national park rangers in South Africa have established anti-poaching units to combat the rhino poachers on the front line, sometimes resulting in death of the poachers. Private security organisations act independently and in collaboration with national park rangers. Both parties, private and public, employ tactics and technology generally reserved for the battlefield. These organizations employ equipment, including Unmanned Aerial Vehicles, military-grade night-vision and thermal binoculars, ground sensors and camera traps that detect human seismic activity or motion and send automatic notifications to ground response teams. Typically, the rangers are armed with anti-personal firearms the quality of which depends on country restrictions and funding. For example, Zimbabwe Park rangers are permitted to carry AK-47, however, in South Africa much of the wildlife is privately owned and hence the Private Security companies that protect the wildlife are not permitted to carry fully automatic weapons.

=== Sanctuaries ===
Rhino sanctuaries are private and secure locations that aim to breed rhinos to restore their population. At certain sanctuaries, the rhino horns are trimmed and stockpiled to reduce poaching and accumulate value. The world’s biggest rhino farm consists of over 1,300 rhinos and is situated in Krugersdorp, South Africa.

== Anti-poaching organisations and conservation organisations ==
There exist both governmental and independent organisations that attempt to combat rhino-poaching in South Africa.

=== Government of the Republic of South Africa ===
The South African government has integrated several of their organisations to collectively suppress rhino poaching in South Africa. The governmental departments include the Department of Environmental Affairs (DEA), the Department of Defence and the South African Police Service. These departments have been actively involved in the arrests of rhino poachers and traffickers in South Africa.

=== Hemmersbach Rhino Force ===
Rhino Force has five private anti-poaching squads operating in the Great Kruger area. They patrol the private game reserves that comprise the area, sweeping the borders to detect signs of entry. They originated in South Africa in 2017 through collaboration with a German entrepreneur and a local private security expert with the goal to prevent Rhinoceros deaths.

=== Rhisotope ===
Rhisotope is an initiative by University of Witwatersrand in cooperation with Rosatom where small amounts of rare radioisotopes are injected into the rhino horns. The nuclides have no health impact on rhinos or humans, but can be easily detected on borders thus increasing risk for the traders.

== Notable seizures ==
The Environmental Investigation Agency reported that up to and including September 2018, 583 seizures of rhino horn had been recorded consisting of approximately 1,770 horns and roughly weighing 4,927 kilograms. The countries with the greatest quantity of rhino horns seized are South Africa (1,659 kilograms), China (including Hong Kong) (779 kilograms) and Vietnam (608 kilograms).

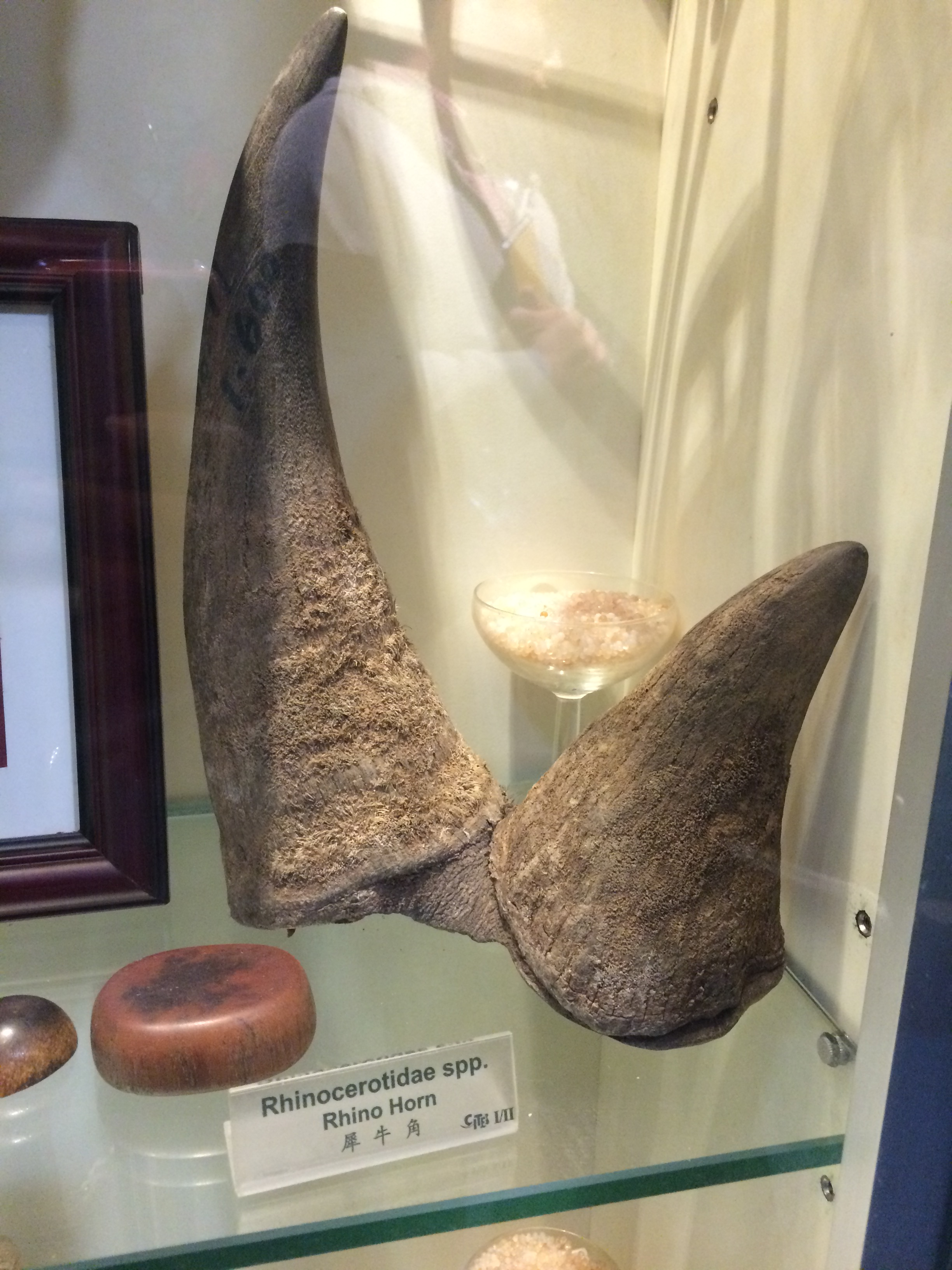
Rhino Horn previously seized by the Hong Kong Governmental authorities on display

The biggest rhino horn seizure ever recorded was made in South Africa's North West Province on 13 April 2019. Two men were arrested for the possession of 167 rhino horns after local authorities received a tip-off that a large batch of rhino horns destined for South East Asia was in transit. The men held a permit to transport the horns within Gauteng Province only but were arrested in North West Province. The two men have each received prison sentences which will run concurrently for 25 years.

Airport authorities at Hong Kong International Airport seized 24 partial rhino horns (worth an estimated value of £780,000) stored in two cardboard boxes that were in transit to Ho Chi Minh City, Vietnam from Johannesburg, South Africa.

OR Tambo International Airport customs authorities seized 36 horns and horn fragments (worth an estimated £1 million) that were sniffed out by a detector dog. The horns were hidden in household objects stored in eight boxes heading for Dubai.

== Legal issues ==
In 1977, the international trade of rhino horn was declared illegal by CITES. Although international trade is illegal, domestic trade regulations are determined by the nominated national government agencies in each country. The South African DEA is responsible for protecting and conserving South Africa’s environment. In 2009, a temporary ban was made on the trade of rhino horn domestically in South Africa, which was later lifted in April 2017 after an ongoing legal dispute between the DEA and private rhino farmers. The decision to lift the ban was motivated by the belief that by legalising the domestic trade of rhino horns criminal activity would be reduced and consumption of rhino horn could be regulated sustainably and ethically. Besides, the funds generated through domestic sales could go towards the preservation and conservation of rhinos in South Africa. Those against the decision argued that it is not a feasible solution to regulate domestic trade as the levels of illegal activity is too high to be controlled effectively.

== See also ==
- Rhino poaching in Assam
- Thandi (rhinoceros)
