= Khama Rhino Sanctuary =

Animal sanctuary in Botswana

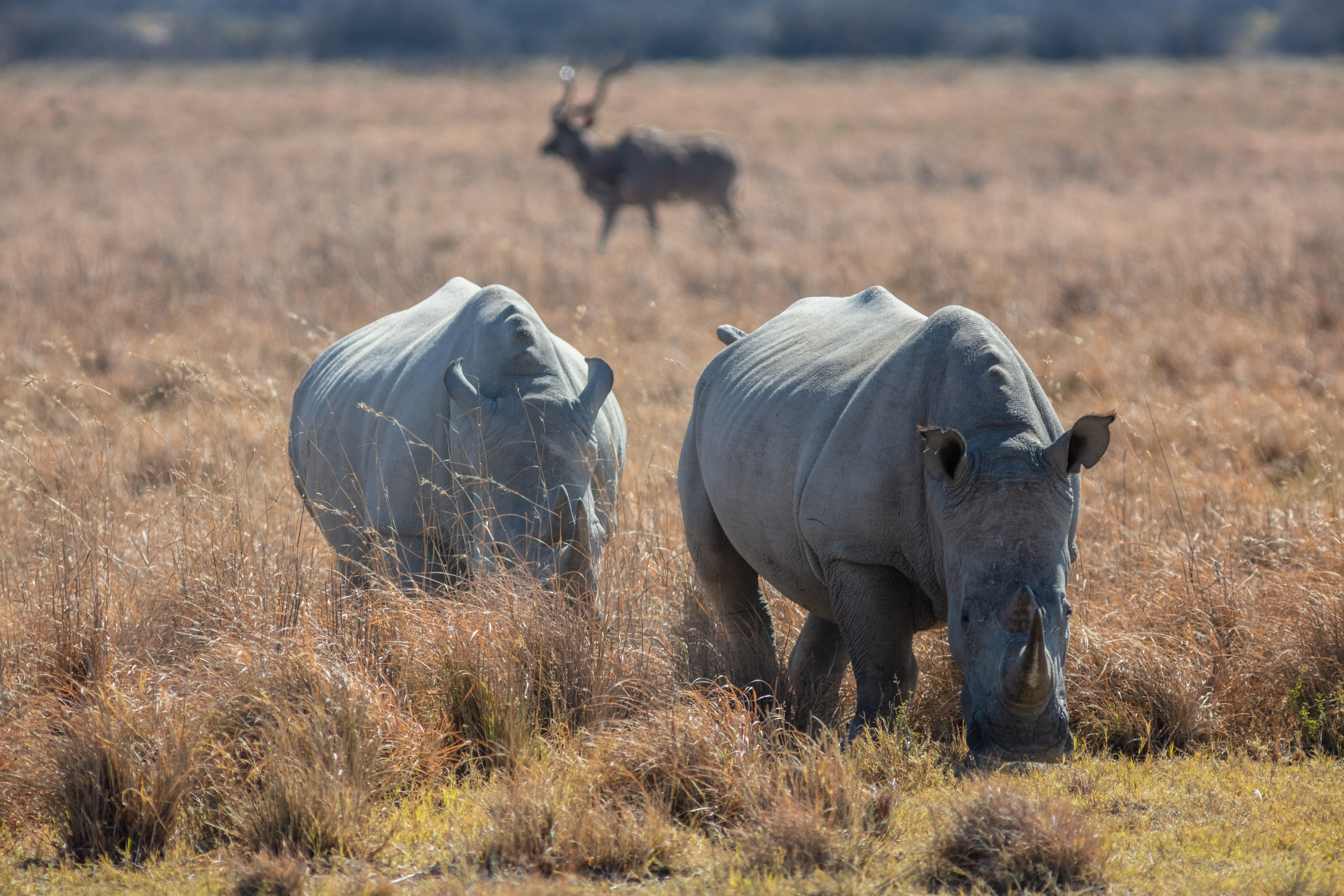
- White rhinos (Ceratotherium simum)

- Location within Botswana
- Coordinates: 22°14′05″S 26°43′12″E
- Area: 8,585 ha (33.15 sq mi)
- Created: 1989
- Visitors: 25,000 (in 2016)
- Website: khamarhinosanctuary.com

Khama Rhino Sanctuary is a community-based wildlife project in Botswana, located about 25 kilometres (16 mi) outside of Serowe. It covers approximately 8,585 hectares (21,210 acres) of Kalahari sandveld and is home to white and black rhinos as well as over 30 other mammal species and more than 230 species of birds. The sanctuary was established in 1992 to help save the vanishing rhinoceros and restore historic wildlife populations, as well as to develop the surrounding community. In addition to breeding rhinos, the sanctuary also has an environmental education centre, campsites, property chalets, and a restaurant onsite. Funds are mainly generated from tourism and from selling animals to other farms when capacity is exceeded on the property.

== History and conservation ==
In 1989, out of concern over rhino poaching, residents from Serowe established a wildlife reserve with the support of Ian Khama. The first four white rhinos were introduced in 1992 and the sanctuary was officially granted the land around the Serwe Pan, a dry lake, by the Ngwato Land Board in 1993. The Critically Endangered black rhino was reintroduced in 2002.

The Sanctuary is home to other wildlife which have settled naturally or been translocated in. This includes giraffes, elands, red hartebeests, gemsboks, zebras, blue wildebeests, springboks, impalas, waterbucks, kudus, cheetahs, black-backed jackals, brown hyenas, leopards, ostriches, antelopes, bat-eared foxes, lynxes, African wild cats, steenboks, duikers, caracals, and small spotted genets. Bird species identified at the sanctuary include the helmeted guineafowl and the lappet-faced vulture. The main conservation project undertaken by Khama Rhino Sanctuary is the rhino breeding program. As of 2014, 28 rhinos had been relocated to other wilderness areas in Southern Africa. The Sanctuary's website reports that its long-term goal is to "create an environment in which Black and White Rhino[s] can breed safely" and to reintroduce them into their natural habitats. The first black rhino was born in 2007 and two white rhinos were born in 2009.

The rhinos within the sanctuary are secured by anti-poaching patrols carried out by the rangers and the Botswana Defense Force. By 2014, no rhinos had been poached on the land since the sanctuary's opening. After nearly 30 years of Khama being a safe haven, however, two white rhinos were reported by the Botswana Department of Wildlife and National Parks to have been killed by poachers posing as visitors in 2022; the sanctuary denies it was on their property. In April 2023, four rhinos were shot, two of them fatally, though the motive is unknown as the horns were still intact.
