= Serowe Stadium =

Multi-purpose stadium in Serowe, Botswana

Coordinates: 22.394°S 26.723°E

The Serowe Stadium is a multi-purpose stadium located in the town of Serowe, Botswana. It is a part of the Serowe Sports Complex, a P27 Million integrated-sports project, which was built in 2002 and officially opened in 2003. The Stadium has a capacity of 6,000 spectators. The main stadium has a football pitch, with an athletics running track surrounding the pitch. Inside the centre-piece there are also facilities for high-jump, long-jump, pole vault and other athletics sports. Outside the stadium, but within the same complex, there are numerous netball, volleyball, softball and tennis courts. The centre has provided to be a great tool to local community, providing a standard sporting facility. It has also been proved to become a main training centre for many of the country's national athletes and a base camp for the national teams, reducing the burden on the National Stadium, which is currently the country's only other major sports complex.

== History ==
In mid-2007, structural defects arose around the sports complex, resulting in a possibility of relocating the whole facility. There have been calls from numerous quarters for the relocation of the facility because of huge cracks on the playing courts and office buildings. Another major factor was that the stadium would already have to pay P5 million to rehabilitate the soil, due to it being unsuitable for the foundations. However, plans have since been put on hold due to an estimated cost of P20 million for the first phase of the relocation.
