= Botswana Chess Championship =

The Botswana Chess Championship is organized by the Botswana Chess Federation, which was founded in 1982.

== Sponsors ==
The Botswana Chess Championship has previously been sponsored by IBM. Metropolitan Botswana partnered with the Botswana Chess Federation 2006 to 2025. The tournament has been sponsored by BetXplosion since 2026.

== Winners ==
Year	Champion
1978	Alfred Eddie Basa
1981	Graham Blackburne
1982	Pete Hamely
1986	Gotile Madikwe
1987	Dabilani Buthali
1988	John Hutchison
1989	John Hutchison
1990	John Hutchison
1991	John Hutchison
1992	Gosekelwe Moseki
1993	Nedjo Stevanovic
1994	Nedjo Stevanovic
1995	Nedjo Stevanovic
1996	Ignatius Njobvu
1997	Nedjo Stevanovic
1998	Ofentse Molale
1999	Ofentse Molale
2000	Ignatius Njobvu
2001	John Hutchison
2002	Ofentse Molale
2003	Ignatius Njobvu
2004	Providence Oatlhotse
2005	Phemelo Khetho
2006	Phemelo Khetho
2007	Phemelo Khetho
2008	Providence Oatlhotse
2009	Providence Oatlhotse
2010	Barileng Gaealafshwe
2011	Abel Dzilani
2012	Providence Oatlhotse
2013	Ignatius Njobvu
2014	Phemelo Khetho
2015	Providence Oatlhotse
2016	Barileng Gaealafshwe
2017	Barileng Gaealafshwe
2018	Providence Oatlhotse
2019	Phemelo Khetho
2020	Thuso Mosutha
2022	Moakofi Notha
2023	Gomolemo Rongwane
2024	Providence Oatlhotse
2025	Providence Oatlhotse
2026	Providence Oatlhotse
