= Patrick van Rensburg =

South African-Motswana anti-apartheid activist and educator

- Born: 3 December 1931; Durban, Natal, Union of South Africa
- Died: 23 May 2017; Serowe, Botswana
- Occupation: Writer
- Writing career
- Notable awards: Right Livelihood Award

Patrick van Rensburg (3 December 1931 − 23 May 2017) was a South African-born anti-apartheid activist and educator. In the 1960s, he founded Swaneng Hill School in Serowe, Botswana, and the nationwide Brigades Movement in that country. In the 1980s, he founded the Mmegi national newspaper and the Foundation for Education with Production, which promoted his ideas in South Africa, Botswana, and Zimbabwe. In 1981, he was awarded the Right Livelihood Award "for developing replicable educational models for the third world majority".

== Life ==
Van Rensburg was born in Durban, South Africa. His parents separated when he was young, and he was raised by his Afrikaner grandmother and her French Mauritian husband. The family spoke English at home and were Roman Catholic: a big difference from the traditional Afrikaner upbringing. Van Rensburg attended St. Henry's Marist Brothers' College and Glenwood High School. He had three children: sons Mothusi van Rensburg and Thomas van Rensburg, and daughter Joanna Forbes.

== Diplomatic and political activities ==
Van Rensburg was South African Vice-Consul in the Belgian Congo (now Democratic Republic of Congo) from February 1956 till May 1957, when he resigned as a protest against South Africa's apartheid policies of racial discrimination. He joined the Liberal Party of South Africa, becoming the party's organising secretary for the Transvaal province in September 1958.

In 1959, he moved to the UK, where he almost immediately began helping organise the 1960 campaign to boycott South African goods in the UK and the Netherlands. Other organisers and supporters of the campaign included Julius Nyerere, Trevor Huddleston, Canon John Collins and Tennyson Makiwane. The Boycott Movement soon grew into the British Anti-Apartheid Movement.

Van Rensburg was vilified by Afrikaners for his part in the campaign, and when he returned to South Africa in 1960, his passport was confiscated and he fled over the border to the Swaziland Protectorate.

== Botswana ==
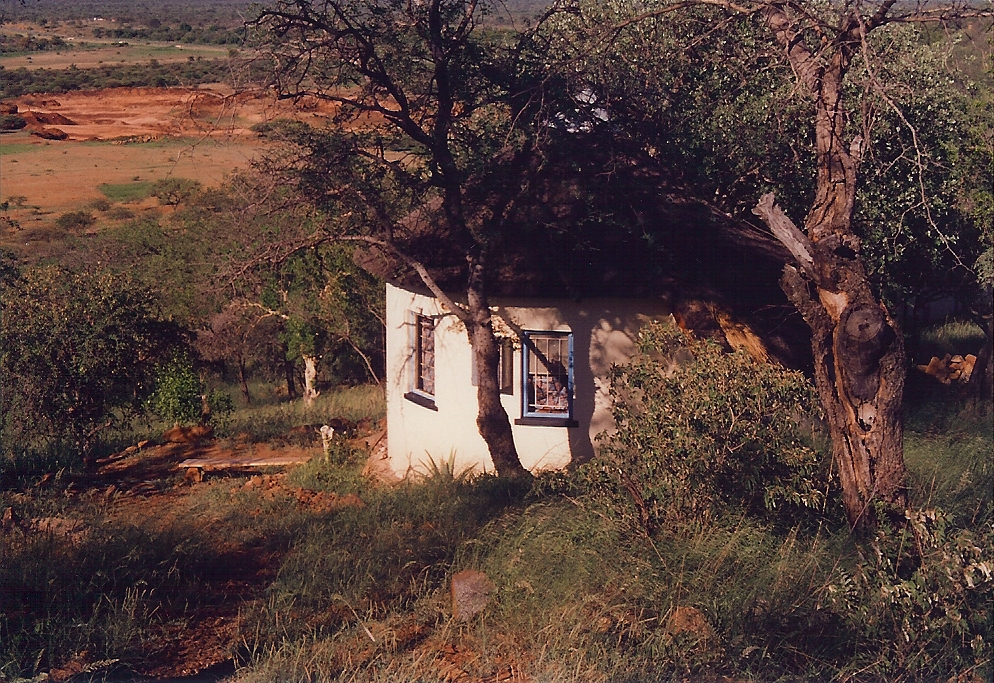
One of the original staff houses at Swaneng Hill School, Serowe, Botswana

In 1962, he moved to the Bechuanaland Protectorate (now Botswana), where he undertook many educational and social initiatives. In the 1980s, he founded the Foundation for Education with Production. Van Rensburg is the founder of Mmegi newspaper, Botswana's leading private newspaper. The newspaper began as a Swaneng Hill School’s newsletter called “Mmegi wa Dikgang” in Serowe. Towards the end of his life, he was one of Botswana's elder statesmen, having written a regular column for years for Mmegi, the independent daily newspaper.

Van Rensburg died on 23 May 2017 in Serowe.

== Works ==
- Guilty Land. London: Penguin, 1962. ISBN B0000CL9AT
- Report from Swaneng Hill. Uppsala: Dag Hammarskjold Foundation, 1974. ISBN 91-85214-01-9
- The Serowe brigades: Alternative education in Botswana. Macmillan for the Bernard van Leer Foundation, 1978. ISBN 0-333-23594-0
- With Andrew Boyd. Atlas of African Affairs. London: Methuen, 1962. ISBN 0-416-64770-7.
- Van Rensburg, P. (1971). A new approach to rural development. Botswana Notes & Records, 3(1), 201–215.
- Van Rensburg, P. (1980). Another look at the Serowe Brigades. Prospects, 10(4), 379–391.
- Van Rensburg, P. (1978). Education and production as a lever for another development. Development dialogue, 2, 81–88.

Van Rensburg had written a number of titles for the Dag Hammarskjöld Foundation.

== Awards ==
- 1981 Right Livelihood Award, with Bill Mollison and Mike Cooley
