= Resego Kgosidintsi =

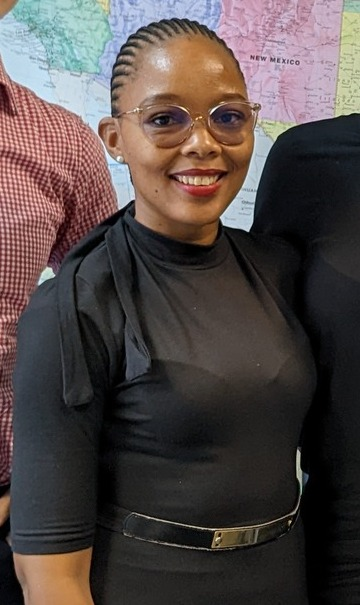
- Kgosidintsi in 2022
- Born: Resego Natalie Kgosidintsi; Serowe, Botswana
- Education: University of Botswana
- Political party: Botswana Democratic Party (since 2023)

Resego Natalie Kgosidintsi is a Botswana women's rights activist and political candidate. In political circles, she is known as Petrol Bomb for her outspoken political beliefs.

== Early life and education ==
Resego Kgosidintsi is the daughter of Bontsibokae and Colleen Kgosidintsi, born in Serowe, Botswana. As a child, she participated in school debate teams, traveling to Ghana and Zimbabwe. She studied political science at the University of Botswana. While in university, Kgosidintsi served as the Student Representative Council's Minister of Information and Publicity, and she was the first woman chairperson of the Movement Against Student Suppression.

== Career ==
Kgosidintsi has gained notoriety for her direct approach in protesting violence against women. Politically, she has supported the Botswana National Front and its leader Duma Boko. She describes herself as a "vagina justice activist" and supports the legalization of sex work. She has been involved with the mobilization of women political candidates in response to gender inequality in Botswana political bodies, seeking to have a woman contest every political seat in the 2024 Botswana general election.

Kgosidintsi was Village Ward Secretary and Treasurer for Gaborone Central and was then elected as an additional member of BNF South Central Region. She then served as the secretary general of the Botswana National Front Women's League. In 2020, she was arrested and then released the following day, prompting criticism of the government for arresting opposition members.

Kgosidintsi sought the presidency of the Botswana National Front Youth League in 2020. The contest was delayed until 2022, at which point she defeated opponent Carter Joseph by 337 votes to 26. She also sought the Parliamentary seat of the Gaborone Bonnington North constituency in 2022. Kgosidintsi caused controversy in October 2022 when she publicly criticized opposition party leadership for their inability to unseat the majority party.

== Personal life ==
Kgosidintsi began dating politician Karabo Matonkomane in 2019. The couple announced in 2021 that they were expecting a child together. In 2022, she expressed her intention to join the Botswana Defence Force.
