= Swaneng Hill School =

Secondary school in Serowe, Botswana

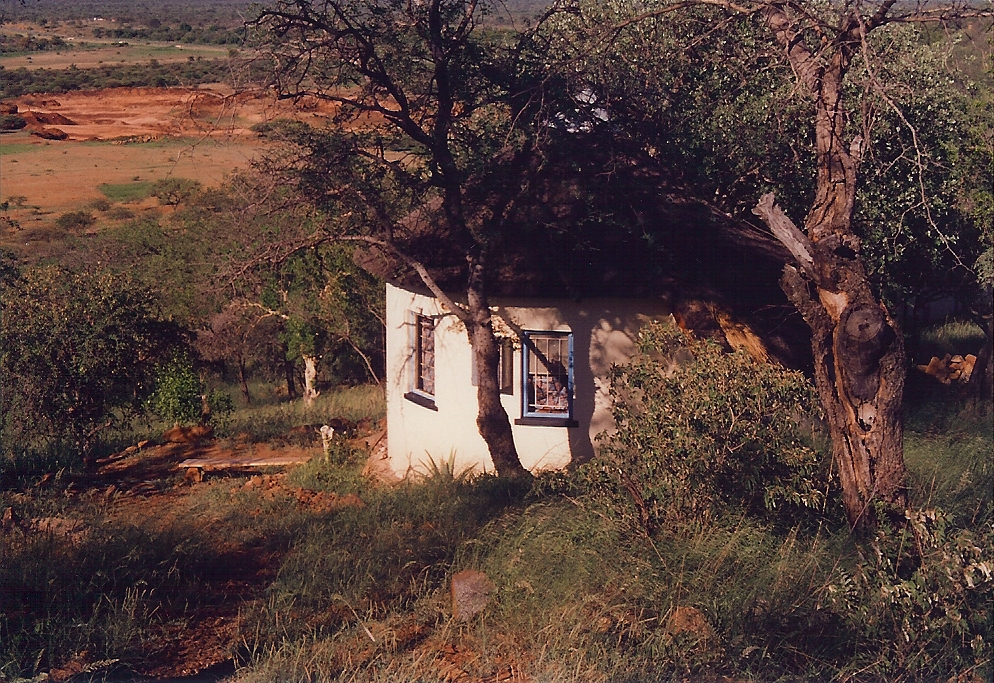
- One of the original staff houses at Swaneng Hill School

Location
- Serowe, Botswana
- 22.4136°S 26.7478°E

Information
- Opened: 11 February 1963

Swaneng Hill School was the first of three secondary schools that were founded by the late Patrick van Rensburg in Serowe, Botswana, the other two being Shashe and Madiba schools. The groundwork for Swaneng was laid in 1962, shortly after Van Rensburg, already a prominent anti-Apartheid figure, took up permanent residence in the then Bechuanaland Protectorate. At the end of the year, he and his wife Elizabeth along with community supporters received permission to start a secondary school in Serowe. The school was built on what was the eastern fringes of the village at the time, approximately 4-7 miles from the center of the village. By the time the school opened on 11 February 1963, it had 55 applications, even though it only had space for 29 students, so space was given to those who applied first.

Of the school's birth, a later head teacher, Ms. Gabalape Autlwetse, has observed:

This was the school that nearly built itself. The first students worked to build their own classroom that opened in February 1963. They built many more classrooms, laboratories, and workshops thereafter. The early students also gardened, cooked, cleaned, and did much of the maintenance. By 1967–1968 the school had 20% of all secondary students in the whole country. Two years later, when the building program grew too big and the number of primary school completers jumped, Patrick started the Builders' Brigade. To manage this type of training, he launched the Serowe Youth Development Association, the forerunner of today's community trusts. Soon there were other brigades in Serowe, and not long after, brigades and brigade trusts all around the new nation of Botswana.

From the beginning, Van Rensburg and other staff members conceived of Swaneng as a centre of development as well as learning. The curriculum included practical subjects like agriculture, building, carpentry, metalwork, technical drawing, and typing. New academic subject matter was introduced as "Development Studies".

Van Renburg's experience with the schools and Brigades ultimately led to his establishment of the Foundation of Education with Production (FEP) in 1980, which sought to create a new blend of theory and practice in education, to be spread internationally as well as in Botswana.

== See also ==
- Education in Botswana
