= A Question of Power =

1973 novel by Bessie Head

- Author: Bessie Head
- Language: English
- Genre: Novel
- Publisher: Davis-Poynter
- Publication date: 1973; 53 years ago
- Publication place: United Kingdom
- Media type: Print
- Preceded by: Maru
- Followed by: The Collector of Treasures and Other Botswana Village Tales

A Question of Power is a novel by the South African-born Motswana writer Bessie Head, first published in London, England, in 1973. The novel follows Elizabeth as she leaves South Africa to live in Botswana and experiences power relationships. Encyclopædia Britannica describes it as a "frankly autobiographical account of disorientation and paranoia in which the heroine survives by sheer force of will".

Elizabeth searches for wholeness, in a journey through hell.

== Publication history ==
- London: Davis-Poynter, 1973.
- New York: Pantheon, 1974.
- Heinemann Educational Books (African Writers Series 149), 1974; 1986.
- Penguin Modern Classics, with an introduction by Margaret Busby, 2002; Penguin African Writers, 2012.
