= Botswana Society =

Learned society

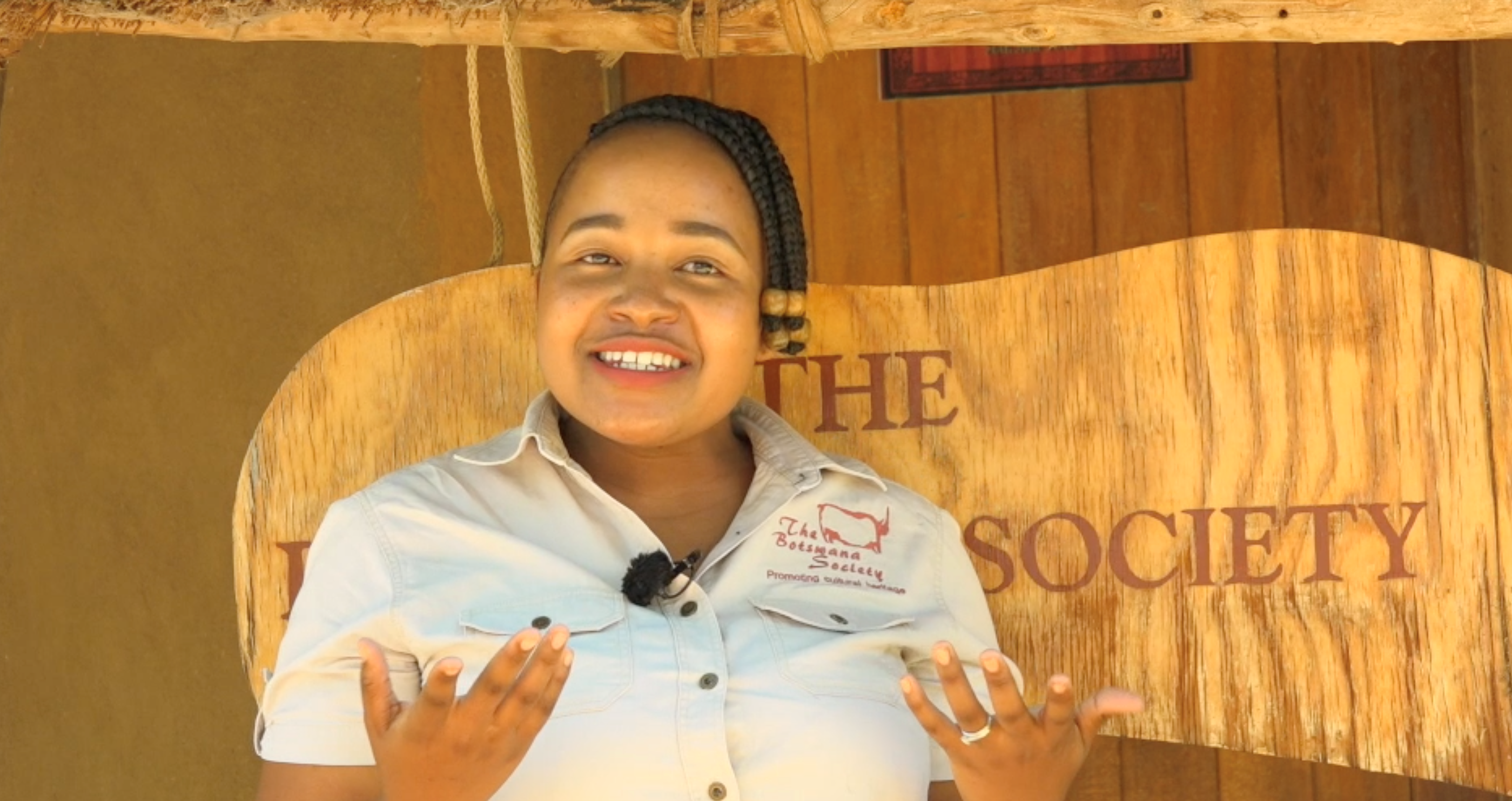
- Bono Mmusi, Society Project Manager
- Established: 1968; 58 years ago
- Type: Learned society
- Headquarters: Gaborone
- Region served: Botswana
- Methods: Book publishing, cultural tours, research
- Affiliations: University of Botswana
- Website: www.thebotswanasociety.net

The Botswana Society is a learned society in Botswana. Founded in 1968, the Botswana Society aims to advance "knowledge of Botswana in all disciplines and on all aspects of the nation's cultural, scientific and environmental heritage".

When the Botswana Society was formed, it played a crucial role in shaping Botswana's research agenda. Its annual journal, Botswana Notes and Records., was the country's first research journal and published many seminal articles through the 1970s. The Society has also published a number of books on the country's heritage ranging from botany to zoology. During its heyday in the 1970s and 1980s, the Botswana Society sponsored a number of important national conferences on issues of national importance, and helped shape government policy agendas on issues such as tourism, wildlife, and land policy. During this time, the Botswana Society was led by Alec Campbell, who maintained its high profile in his other capacity as director of Botswana's National Museum & Art Gallery.

As Botswana's economy grew and the country achieved middle-income status, many of the Botswana's Society's original functions were taken over by new university and governmental bodies. In order to carve out a new niche for itself, the Botswana Society has refocused on promoting cultural tourism in the country. It runs a popular bus tour of the capital, Gaborone, and collaborates with local communities to develop relevant tourist sites.

== History ==
The Botswana Society was established in 1968 in Gaborone shortly after Botswana's independence in 1966. It was formed as a learned society to document and preserve knowledge of the new nation's cultural, scientific and environmental heritage.

The founding members included archaeologist and museum director Alec Campbell and other staff from the Botswana National Museum and the University of Botswana. The Society was granted patronage under the President of Botswana. In 1969 it launched its annual journal Botswana Notes and Records, which became the country's first peer-reviewed research journal.

Since the 1970s, the Society has organised public lectures, field trips, archaeological and wildlife tours and national symposia on topics of public importance such as the Okavango Delta and rock art preservation. It is funded through membership subscriptions, donations and sales of its publications.

== Activities ==
- Publication of Botswana Notes and Records (annually since 1969)
- Publication of books and conference proceedings on Botswana's history, natural history and culture
- Monthly public lectures at the Botswana National Museum and University of Botswana
- Cultural and ecological field trips and guided tours
- Annual symposium

== Publications ==
Botswana Notes and Records
