= Mortals (novel) =

2003 novel by Norman Rush

- Author: Norman Rush
- Publisher: Alfred A. Knopf
- Publication date: May 27, 2003

Mortals is the second novel by American author Norman Rush, and was published in 2003. The close third-person narrative follows Ray Finch, an American anthropology CIA agent student in Botswana after the collapse of the Soviet Union. Ray suspects his beloved wife Iris of an affair with Davis Morel, a Harvard-educated eclectic medicine practitioner and anti-theist with a mission to rid Africa of religion, Christianity in particular.
