= Laokhowa Wildlife Sanctuary =

- IUCN category IV (habitat/species management area)
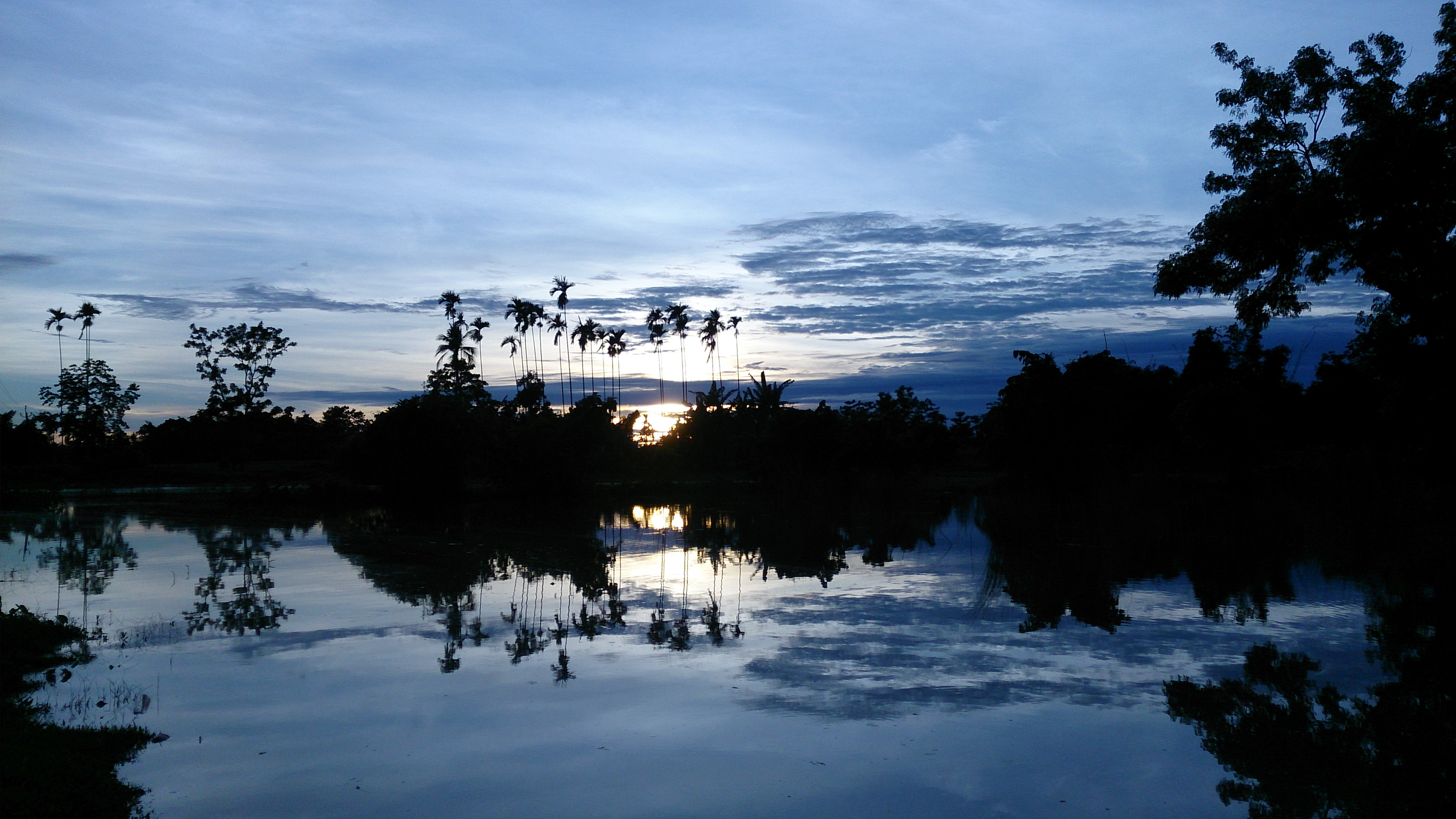
- Sunset in a flood affected zone of Laokhowa Wildlife Sanctuary

- Location within Assam Location within India
- Interactive map of Laokhowa Wildlife Sanctuary
- Location: Assam, India
- Nearest city: Nagaon
- Coordinates: 26°30′24″N 92°42′38″E
- Area: 70.13 km^{2} (27.08 sq mi)
- Established: 1972; 54 years ago
- Governing body: Department of Environment & Forests, Assam

Laokhowa Wildlife Sanctuary is a wildlife sanctuary in the state of Assam in India covering 70.13 km^{2} (27.08 sq mi) on the south bank of the Brahmaputra River in Nagaon district. It is a part of the Laokhowa-Burachapori eco-system. Over 200 bird species have been recorded in the sanctuary, including migratory birds.

Laokhowa Wildlife Sanctuary had more than 70 Indian rhinoceroses in the early 1980s, which were all killed by poachers. In 2016, two individuals, a female and her calf, were reintroduced from Kaziranga National Park, but both died within months due to natural causes.
