= Mositi Torontle =

Oral poet, novelist and teacher (born 1964)

- Born: 1964 (age 61–62)
- Education: University of Botswana
- Occupations: Oral poet and novelist

Mositi Torontle (born 1964) is a Motswana oral poet and novelist.

== Life ==
Mositi Torontle was born and grew up in Francistown, Botswana. She has a degree from the University of Botswana and has worked as a teacher. Her 1993 novel The Victims examined labour immigration from neighbouring countries to South Africa.

== Works ==
- The Victims, 1993
