= Mating (novel) =

1991 novel by Norman Rush

- First edition
- Author: Norman Rush
- Cover artist: (Note: The cover art for Mating, like that for Rush's earlier short story collection Whites, and later novel "Mortals", incorporates a detail from The Garden of Earthly Delights, a triptych by Hieronymous Bosch.)
- Language: English
- Genre: Novel
- Publisher: Alfred A. Knopf
- Publication date: 1991
- Publication place: United States
- Media type: Print
- ISBN: 978-0-394-54472-4

Mating (1991) is a novel by American author Norman Rush. It is a first-person narrative by an unnamed American anthropology graduate student in Botswana around 1980. It focuses on her relationship with Nelson Denoon, a controversial American social scientist who has founded an experimental matriarchal village in the Kalahari Desert.

Mating won the 1991 National Book Award for Fiction. The novel experienced a resurgence of popularity in the 2020s.

== Reception ==
Critical reviews of Norman Rush's first novel, Mating, have mostly been positive. New York Times critic, Jim Shepard writes, "Mr. Rush has created one of the wiser and wittier fictive meditations on the subject of mating. His novel illuminates why we yield when we don't have to. It seeks to illuminate the nature of true intimacy—how to define it, how to know when one has achieved it." Although "[a] certain amount of rambling does take place. . . And important secondary characters in Tsau, even given the narrator's focus on Denoon and her own self-absorption, are sketchily drawn," Shepard nonetheless extols Rush's "vigorous and luminous prose." The New York Times also lists the book as having received multiple votes on their 2006 survey "What is the best work of American Fiction of the last 25 years?"

In the Harvard Review, critic Robert Faggen praises the work as a "masterpiece of fine-hammered first person narrative." While Faggen describes the narrator's beloved, Nelson Denoon, as "dull" and is the novel's "primary weakness," his commendation for the book focuses on the narrator herself, who "is most memorable in her quest for her own utopia of equal love of which she teases us with beautiful, fleeting moments of possibility."

Knopf editor for Mating, Ann Close, commends Rush's "facility in conveying the voice and sensibility of his amusingly self-absorbed narrator, a feminist anthropologist whose pursuit of a famous social scientist is a timely riff on a perennial theme, What do women want?" She criticizes the book for having "too much detailed sociology," but "in the main readers will be captivated by the narrator's quirky, obsessive voice and the situation she describes: a game of amorous relationships complicated by feminist doctrine and an exotic locale."

A book reviewer for the Library Journal, Ann Sapp, explains her recommendations: "though there is plenty of action and interaction among the characters, this is largely a novel of ideas and anthropological information. The humor is at a sophisticated level, as is the vocabulary. For public library with an educated community."

Newsweek reviewer David Gates, on the other hand, is not so captivated by the narrator. He says that the novel "is state-of-the-art artifice: she [the narrator] talks, she introspects, she even suffers. But she never quite comes to life. Maybe that's the point—we are talking narcissism—but despite the work that went into her, we can't take her to heart."

The book has also been criticized for its representation of Botswana. In Africa Today, critic Sheldon Weeks states, "This novel is set in Botswana, about Botswana, but it is not of or for Botswana. It has been written for Americans and is more about America and American perceptions of the world than Africa." The book overall, and the ending, specifically, was "weak, frustrating, and disappointing, fitting a short story but not one aspiring to be an epic novel." Weeks recommends that "those who want to read a utopian novel by and for Africa, by an African might want to seek out Season of Anomy [by Wole Soyinka]."

The Virginia Quarterly Review mentions the first-person narrator's "emotional and intellectual entanglement" with her beloved, but concludes with the general, positive statement that "The context of their encounter and of the ensuing relationship plays a significant role in their experience, and is forcefully depicted in the sophisticated, thought-provoking novel."

More recent mention of Mating appeared in relation to Rush's more recent books. John Updike, reviewing Rush's 2003 novel, Mortals, in The New Yorker said "There was much of this claustral pillow talk—self-consciousness squared—in Rush’s previous, prize-winning novel, Mating, but there the point of view was that of the nameless female protagonist, a thirty-two-year-old anthropologist engaged in a courtship pursuit of an older, married utopian activist, and this male reader, through whatever kink in his gendered nature, was comfortable with their orgies of talk." Updike preferred the female narrator in Mating, over the male protagonist in Mortals.

In an interview with Norman Rush and his wife Elsa for The Paris Review, Joshua Pashman describes Rush's first novel as "Both an adventure story and a 'novel of ideas,' Mating is also a microscopic, Lawrentian examination of an embattled courtship."

In reviewing his most recent book, Subtle Bodies (2013), Rachel Arons in The New Yorker mentions his previous two, "both of which included delectable digressions on Marxism, economic policy, African development, and literature." Arons added that "Rush has a genius for depicting language that grows out of sustained romantic partnership—what the unnamed narrator-protagonist of “Mating” called an “idioverse,” a private patois made up of shared references and sayings, occasional neologisms, and common words that have taken on new meanings."

Other reviews of Mating in 2013, without mentioning Rush's recent work, include Brandon Robshaw's "Paperback Review" in The Independent, and Anna Scott's review in The Guardian. Robshaw states that "This novel first appeared in 1991, but still seems extraordinary, innovative, sui generis. . . It’s a novel of real, original ideas about feminism, love, politics, race and anthropology."* Scott says the "novel highlights the disjunction between ideals and realities. From bedroom politics to the exploitation of the developing world by the west, a chaos of misunderstanding is revealed. But what ultimately stands out is a quirkily acquisitive heroine compulsively collecting 'new material to be integrated into the study of me.'"
