= Norman Rush =

American writer

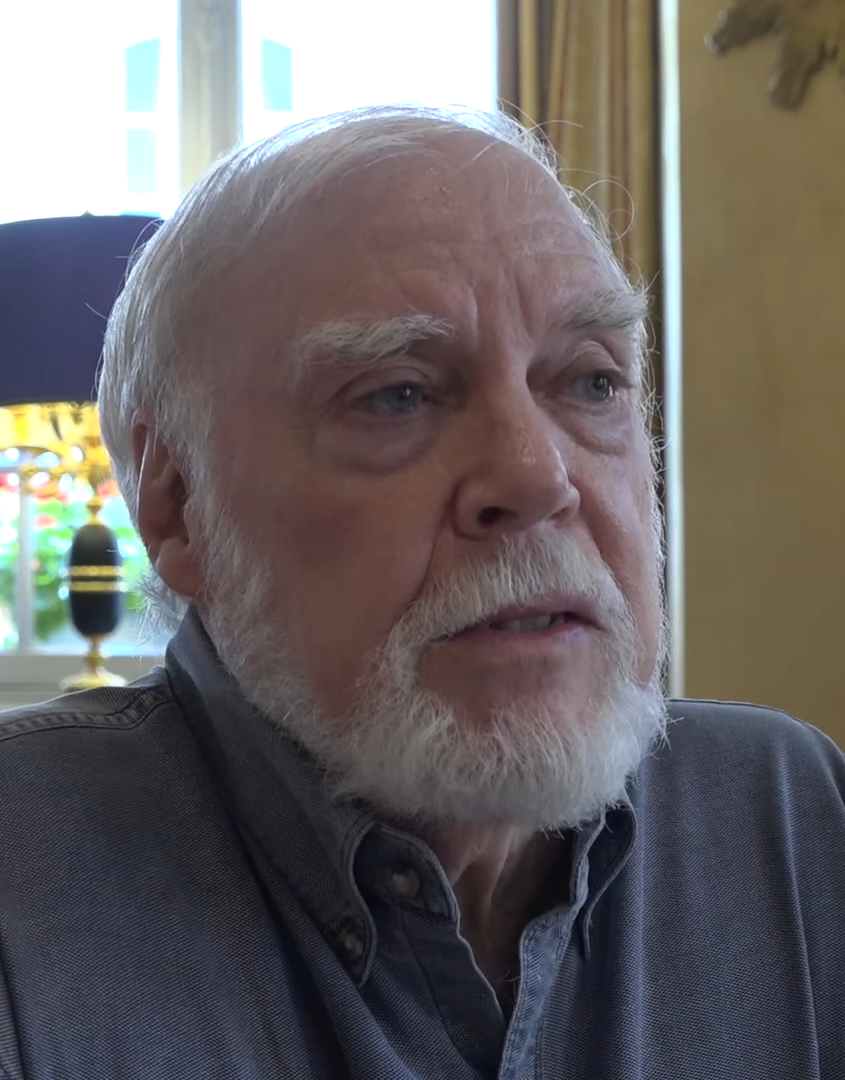
- Norman Rush in 2015
- Born: October 24, 1933 (age 93); San Francisco, California, U.S.
- Education: Swarthmore College (BA)
- Occupation: Writer
- Notable work: Whites (1986); Mating (1991)

Norman Rush (born October 24, 1933) is an American writer most of whose introspective novels and short stories are set in Botswana in the 1980s. He won the U.S. National Book Award and the 1992 Irish Times/Aer Lingus International Fiction Prize for his novel Mating.

== Life and career ==
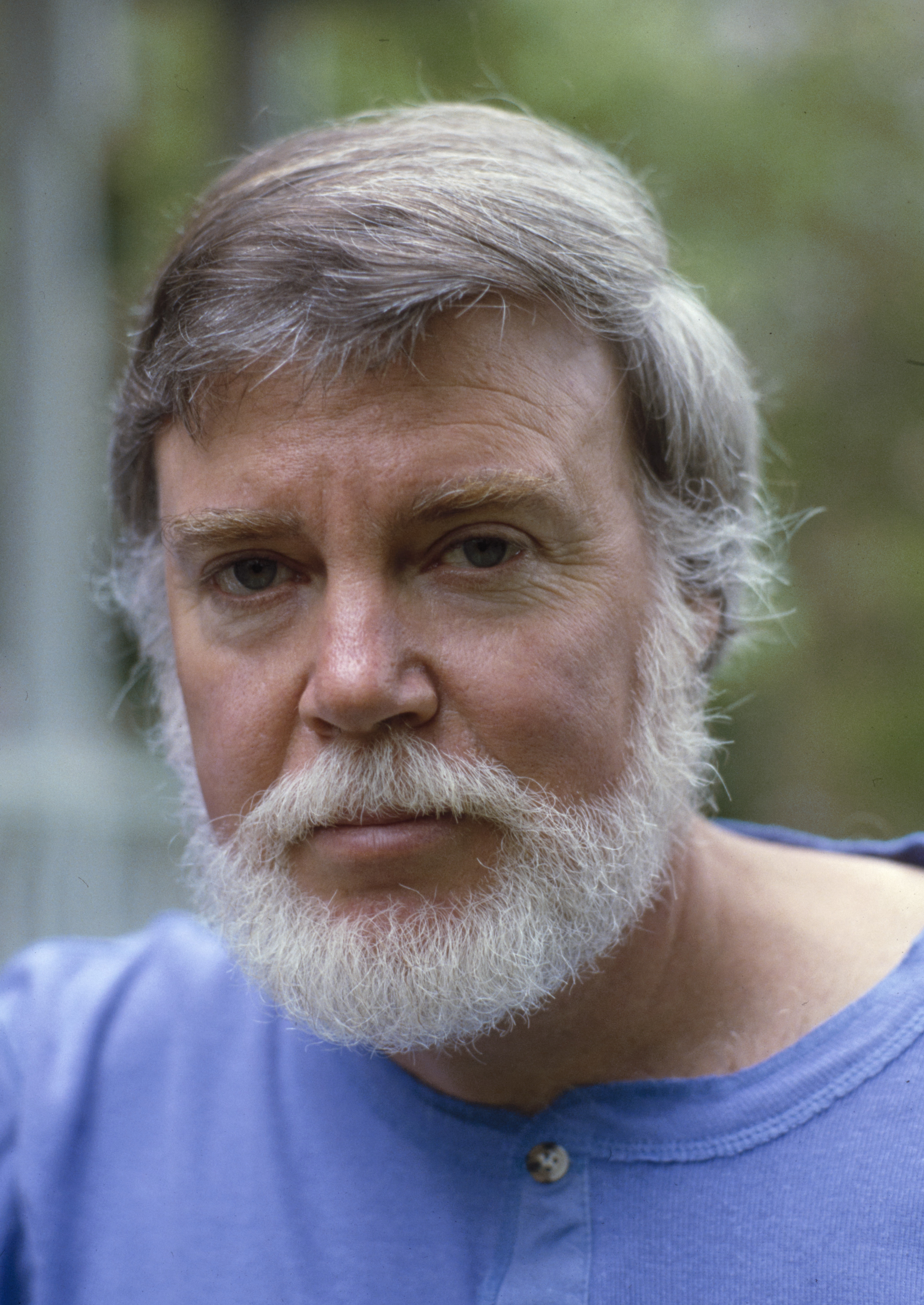
Rush at home in New City, New York, in 1986

Rush was born in San Francisco and raised in Oakland, the son of Roger and Leslie (Chesse) Rush. He graduated from Swarthmore College in 1956. During the Korean War, he was sentenced to two years incarceration for his status as a conscientious objector to the war, but was released on parole after nine months. After working for fifteen years as a book dealer, he changed careers to become a teacher and found he had more time to write. He submitted a short story about his teaching experiences to The New Yorker, which was published in 1978.

Rush and his wife Elsa were co-directors of the Peace Corps in Botswana from 1978 to 1983, which provided material for his short story collection Whites (1986). Whites was a finalist for the 1987 Pulitzer Prize for Fiction. His Botswana experience also served as the setting for his novels Mating (1991) and Mortals (2003).

Rush lives with his wife, Elsa, in Rockland County, New York, in a farmhouse which they have shared since 1961, located on High Tor Mountain.

Rush's third novel, Subtle Bodies, was published in September 2013.

== Published works ==
- Whites, short stories Alfred A. Knopf, 1986, ISBN 978-0-394-54471-7 — finalist for the Pulitzer Prize for Fiction
- Mating, Knopf, 1991, ISBN 978-0-394-54472-4 — winner of the National Book Award for Fiction
- Mortals, a novel Knopf, 2003, ISBN 978-0-679-40622-8.
- Subtle Bodies, a novel, Knopf, 2013, ISBN 978-1-4000-4250-0.
