= Maru (novel) =

1971 book

- Author: Bessie Head
- Language: Setswana
- Genre: Fiction
- Published: 1971
- Publication place: South Africa
- Pages: 127
- Preceded by: When Rain Clouds Gather
- Followed by: A Question of Power

Maru is a 1971 novel by Bessie Head, exploring racism and ethnic conflict, specifically that of the Tswana and San peoples. It centres on an orphaned San girl who comes to the community of Dilepe to teach.
